

271001–271100 

|-bgcolor=#fefefe
| 271001 ||  || — || December 11, 2002 || Socorro || LINEAR || — || align=right data-sort-value="0.95" | 950 m || 
|-id=002 bgcolor=#E9E9E9
| 271002 ||  || — || December 11, 2002 || Socorro || LINEAR || — || align=right | 1.3 km || 
|-id=003 bgcolor=#E9E9E9
| 271003 ||  || — || December 11, 2002 || Socorro || LINEAR || — || align=right | 1.7 km || 
|-id=004 bgcolor=#fefefe
| 271004 ||  || — || December 11, 2002 || Socorro || LINEAR || — || align=right | 1.1 km || 
|-id=005 bgcolor=#fefefe
| 271005 ||  || — || December 2, 2002 || Socorro || LINEAR || — || align=right data-sort-value="0.93" | 930 m || 
|-id=006 bgcolor=#fefefe
| 271006 ||  || — || December 3, 2002 || Palomar || NEAT || V || align=right data-sort-value="0.81" | 810 m || 
|-id=007 bgcolor=#fefefe
| 271007 ||  || — || December 10, 2002 || Palomar || NEAT || NYS || align=right data-sort-value="0.86" | 860 m || 
|-id=008 bgcolor=#fefefe
| 271008 ||  || — || December 28, 2002 || Pla D'Arguines || Pla D'Arguines Obs. || — || align=right | 1.1 km || 
|-id=009 bgcolor=#fefefe
| 271009 Reitterferenc ||  ||  || December 25, 2002 || Piszkéstető || K. Sárneczky || MAS || align=right data-sort-value="0.94" | 940 m || 
|-id=010 bgcolor=#fefefe
| 271010 ||  || — || December 28, 2002 || Kitt Peak || Spacewatch || — || align=right | 1.1 km || 
|-id=011 bgcolor=#E9E9E9
| 271011 ||  || — || December 31, 2002 || Socorro || LINEAR || — || align=right | 1.9 km || 
|-id=012 bgcolor=#fefefe
| 271012 ||  || — || December 31, 2002 || Socorro || LINEAR || — || align=right | 1.1 km || 
|-id=013 bgcolor=#E9E9E9
| 271013 ||  || — || December 31, 2002 || Socorro || LINEAR || — || align=right | 2.4 km || 
|-id=014 bgcolor=#fefefe
| 271014 ||  || — || December 31, 2002 || Socorro || LINEAR || — || align=right data-sort-value="0.95" | 950 m || 
|-id=015 bgcolor=#E9E9E9
| 271015 ||  || — || January 1, 2003 || Socorro || LINEAR || — || align=right | 1.6 km || 
|-id=016 bgcolor=#E9E9E9
| 271016 ||  || — || January 2, 2003 || Socorro || LINEAR || — || align=right | 2.9 km || 
|-id=017 bgcolor=#E9E9E9
| 271017 ||  || — || January 1, 2003 || Socorro || LINEAR || — || align=right | 1.5 km || 
|-id=018 bgcolor=#fefefe
| 271018 ||  || — || January 4, 2003 || Socorro || LINEAR || V || align=right data-sort-value="0.95" | 950 m || 
|-id=019 bgcolor=#fefefe
| 271019 ||  || — || December 11, 2002 || Socorro || LINEAR || H || align=right data-sort-value="0.77" | 770 m || 
|-id=020 bgcolor=#fefefe
| 271020 ||  || — || January 5, 2003 || Socorro || LINEAR || — || align=right | 1.4 km || 
|-id=021 bgcolor=#fefefe
| 271021 ||  || — || January 7, 2003 || Socorro || LINEAR || — || align=right | 1.3 km || 
|-id=022 bgcolor=#fefefe
| 271022 ||  || — || January 5, 2003 || Socorro || LINEAR || V || align=right data-sort-value="0.96" | 960 m || 
|-id=023 bgcolor=#fefefe
| 271023 ||  || — || January 5, 2003 || Socorro || LINEAR || — || align=right | 1.8 km || 
|-id=024 bgcolor=#fefefe
| 271024 ||  || — || January 5, 2003 || Socorro || LINEAR || — || align=right | 2.1 km || 
|-id=025 bgcolor=#fefefe
| 271025 ||  || — || January 7, 2003 || Socorro || LINEAR || V || align=right data-sort-value="0.99" | 990 m || 
|-id=026 bgcolor=#fefefe
| 271026 ||  || — || January 9, 2003 || Socorro || LINEAR || — || align=right data-sort-value="0.97" | 970 m || 
|-id=027 bgcolor=#fefefe
| 271027 ||  || — || January 10, 2003 || Socorro || LINEAR || — || align=right | 1.4 km || 
|-id=028 bgcolor=#fefefe
| 271028 ||  || — || January 2, 2003 || Socorro || LINEAR || — || align=right | 1.1 km || 
|-id=029 bgcolor=#fefefe
| 271029 ||  || — || January 27, 2003 || Socorro || LINEAR || — || align=right | 2.0 km || 
|-id=030 bgcolor=#fefefe
| 271030 ||  || — || January 27, 2003 || Socorro || LINEAR || NYS || align=right data-sort-value="0.83" | 830 m || 
|-id=031 bgcolor=#fefefe
| 271031 ||  || — || January 27, 2003 || Socorro || LINEAR || — || align=right | 1.4 km || 
|-id=032 bgcolor=#fefefe
| 271032 ||  || — || January 27, 2003 || Socorro || LINEAR || — || align=right | 1.1 km || 
|-id=033 bgcolor=#E9E9E9
| 271033 ||  || — || January 27, 2003 || Anderson Mesa || LONEOS || — || align=right | 1.1 km || 
|-id=034 bgcolor=#fefefe
| 271034 ||  || — || January 27, 2003 || Socorro || LINEAR || V || align=right | 1.1 km || 
|-id=035 bgcolor=#fefefe
| 271035 ||  || — || January 27, 2003 || Socorro || LINEAR || NYS || align=right data-sort-value="0.82" | 820 m || 
|-id=036 bgcolor=#fefefe
| 271036 ||  || — || January 31, 2003 || Palomar || NEAT || V || align=right data-sort-value="0.95" | 950 m || 
|-id=037 bgcolor=#fefefe
| 271037 ||  || — || February 2, 2003 || Anderson Mesa || LONEOS || H || align=right | 1.3 km || 
|-id=038 bgcolor=#fefefe
| 271038 ||  || — || February 3, 2003 || Palomar || NEAT || — || align=right | 1.1 km || 
|-id=039 bgcolor=#fefefe
| 271039 ||  || — || February 19, 2003 || Palomar || NEAT || — || align=right | 1.4 km || 
|-id=040 bgcolor=#E9E9E9
| 271040 ||  || — || February 21, 2003 || Palomar || NEAT || — || align=right | 2.0 km || 
|-id=041 bgcolor=#fefefe
| 271041 ||  || — || March 5, 2003 || Socorro || LINEAR || H || align=right | 1.1 km || 
|-id=042 bgcolor=#fefefe
| 271042 ||  || — || March 24, 2003 || Socorro || LINEAR || H || align=right data-sort-value="0.85" | 850 m || 
|-id=043 bgcolor=#fefefe
| 271043 ||  || — || March 26, 2003 || Socorro || LINEAR || H || align=right data-sort-value="0.87" | 870 m || 
|-id=044 bgcolor=#E9E9E9
| 271044 ||  || — || March 27, 2003 || Campo Imperatore || CINEOS || SHF || align=right | 1.4 km || 
|-id=045 bgcolor=#fefefe
| 271045 ||  || — || March 31, 2003 || Socorro || LINEAR || H || align=right data-sort-value="0.64" | 640 m || 
|-id=046 bgcolor=#fefefe
| 271046 ||  || — || March 31, 2003 || Socorro || LINEAR || H || align=right | 1.0 km || 
|-id=047 bgcolor=#fefefe
| 271047 ||  || — || March 31, 2003 || Socorro || LINEAR || H || align=right data-sort-value="0.93" | 930 m || 
|-id=048 bgcolor=#E9E9E9
| 271048 ||  || — || March 21, 2003 || Palomar || NEAT || — || align=right | 3.4 km || 
|-id=049 bgcolor=#E9E9E9
| 271049 ||  || — || March 24, 2003 || Kitt Peak || Spacewatch || — || align=right | 1.3 km || 
|-id=050 bgcolor=#E9E9E9
| 271050 ||  || — || March 23, 2003 || Kitt Peak || Spacewatch || — || align=right | 2.0 km || 
|-id=051 bgcolor=#E9E9E9
| 271051 ||  || — || March 26, 2003 || Palomar || NEAT || — || align=right | 1.1 km || 
|-id=052 bgcolor=#E9E9E9
| 271052 ||  || — || March 26, 2003 || Palomar || NEAT || BRG || align=right | 1.9 km || 
|-id=053 bgcolor=#fefefe
| 271053 ||  || — || March 24, 2003 || Kitt Peak || Spacewatch || — || align=right | 1.4 km || 
|-id=054 bgcolor=#fefefe
| 271054 ||  || — || April 1, 2003 || Socorro || LINEAR || H || align=right data-sort-value="0.65" | 650 m || 
|-id=055 bgcolor=#E9E9E9
| 271055 ||  || — || April 1, 2003 || Socorro || LINEAR || — || align=right | 1.3 km || 
|-id=056 bgcolor=#fefefe
| 271056 ||  || — || April 3, 2003 || Anderson Mesa || LONEOS || H || align=right data-sort-value="0.81" | 810 m || 
|-id=057 bgcolor=#E9E9E9
| 271057 ||  || — || April 5, 2003 || Anderson Mesa || LONEOS || — || align=right | 2.4 km || 
|-id=058 bgcolor=#E9E9E9
| 271058 ||  || — || April 5, 2003 || Anderson Mesa || LONEOS || — || align=right | 2.9 km || 
|-id=059 bgcolor=#E9E9E9
| 271059 ||  || — || April 8, 2003 || Palomar || NEAT || — || align=right | 1.8 km || 
|-id=060 bgcolor=#E9E9E9
| 271060 ||  || — || April 8, 2003 || Kitt Peak || Spacewatch || — || align=right | 1.5 km || 
|-id=061 bgcolor=#E9E9E9
| 271061 ||  || — || April 11, 2003 || Kitt Peak || Spacewatch || — || align=right | 1.5 km || 
|-id=062 bgcolor=#E9E9E9
| 271062 ||  || — || April 24, 2003 || Kitt Peak || Spacewatch || ADE || align=right | 1.8 km || 
|-id=063 bgcolor=#E9E9E9
| 271063 ||  || — || April 27, 2003 || Socorro || LINEAR || — || align=right | 2.3 km || 
|-id=064 bgcolor=#E9E9E9
| 271064 ||  || — || April 25, 2003 || Anderson Mesa || LONEOS || EUN || align=right | 1.7 km || 
|-id=065 bgcolor=#E9E9E9
| 271065 ||  || — || April 26, 2003 || Kitt Peak || Spacewatch || — || align=right data-sort-value="0.94" | 940 m || 
|-id=066 bgcolor=#fefefe
| 271066 ||  || — || April 27, 2003 || Socorro || LINEAR || H || align=right data-sort-value="0.86" | 860 m || 
|-id=067 bgcolor=#E9E9E9
| 271067 ||  || — || April 27, 2003 || Anderson Mesa || LONEOS || — || align=right | 1.0 km || 
|-id=068 bgcolor=#fefefe
| 271068 ||  || — || May 1, 2003 || Kitt Peak || Spacewatch || H || align=right data-sort-value="0.73" | 730 m || 
|-id=069 bgcolor=#fefefe
| 271069 ||  || — || May 2, 2003 || Socorro || LINEAR || H || align=right data-sort-value="0.86" | 860 m || 
|-id=070 bgcolor=#E9E9E9
| 271070 ||  || — || May 1, 2003 || Socorro || LINEAR || fast? || align=right | 1.1 km || 
|-id=071 bgcolor=#E9E9E9
| 271071 ||  || — || May 2, 2003 || Socorro || LINEAR || MAR || align=right | 1.6 km || 
|-id=072 bgcolor=#E9E9E9
| 271072 ||  || — || May 22, 2003 || Kitt Peak || Spacewatch || — || align=right | 1.5 km || 
|-id=073 bgcolor=#FA8072
| 271073 ||  || — || May 28, 2003 || Haleakala || NEAT || — || align=right | 1.6 km || 
|-id=074 bgcolor=#d6d6d6
| 271074 ||  || — || May 27, 2003 || Kitt Peak || Spacewatch || HIL3:2 || align=right | 6.7 km || 
|-id=075 bgcolor=#E9E9E9
| 271075 ||  || — || June 5, 2003 || Kitt Peak || Spacewatch || MAR || align=right | 1.5 km || 
|-id=076 bgcolor=#E9E9E9
| 271076 ||  || — || June 25, 2003 || Socorro || LINEAR || — || align=right | 2.4 km || 
|-id=077 bgcolor=#E9E9E9
| 271077 ||  || — || June 26, 2003 || Socorro || LINEAR || — || align=right | 1.3 km || 
|-id=078 bgcolor=#E9E9E9
| 271078 ||  || — || July 5, 2003 || Haleakala || NEAT || POS || align=right | 3.0 km || 
|-id=079 bgcolor=#E9E9E9
| 271079 ||  || — || July 21, 2003 || Haleakala || NEAT || ADE || align=right | 3.1 km || 
|-id=080 bgcolor=#E9E9E9
| 271080 ||  || — || July 25, 2003 || Palomar || NEAT || JUN || align=right | 1.6 km || 
|-id=081 bgcolor=#fefefe
| 271081 ||  || — || July 25, 2003 || Socorro || LINEAR || V || align=right data-sort-value="0.84" | 840 m || 
|-id=082 bgcolor=#E9E9E9
| 271082 ||  || — || July 22, 2003 || Palomar || NEAT || — || align=right | 2.2 km || 
|-id=083 bgcolor=#E9E9E9
| 271083 ||  || — || July 22, 2003 || Campo Imperatore || CINEOS || AGN || align=right | 1.3 km || 
|-id=084 bgcolor=#d6d6d6
| 271084 ||  || — || August 2, 2003 || Haleakala || NEAT || — || align=right | 4.4 km || 
|-id=085 bgcolor=#E9E9E9
| 271085 ||  || — || August 19, 2003 || Campo Imperatore || CINEOS || — || align=right | 3.0 km || 
|-id=086 bgcolor=#E9E9E9
| 271086 ||  || — || August 18, 2003 || Campo Imperatore || CINEOS || — || align=right | 2.8 km || 
|-id=087 bgcolor=#E9E9E9
| 271087 ||  || — || August 21, 2003 || Palomar || NEAT || — || align=right | 2.4 km || 
|-id=088 bgcolor=#d6d6d6
| 271088 ||  || — || August 21, 2003 || Palomar || NEAT || — || align=right | 4.3 km || 
|-id=089 bgcolor=#E9E9E9
| 271089 ||  || — || August 22, 2003 || Palomar || NEAT || — || align=right | 3.7 km || 
|-id=090 bgcolor=#E9E9E9
| 271090 ||  || — || August 20, 2003 || Palomar || NEAT || GEF || align=right | 1.4 km || 
|-id=091 bgcolor=#E9E9E9
| 271091 ||  || — || August 22, 2003 || Palomar || NEAT || — || align=right | 3.3 km || 
|-id=092 bgcolor=#d6d6d6
| 271092 ||  || — || August 22, 2003 || Palomar || NEAT || — || align=right | 4.1 km || 
|-id=093 bgcolor=#d6d6d6
| 271093 ||  || — || August 20, 2003 || Palomar || NEAT || — || align=right | 4.5 km || 
|-id=094 bgcolor=#d6d6d6
| 271094 ||  || — || August 22, 2003 || Haleakala || NEAT || — || align=right | 4.1 km || 
|-id=095 bgcolor=#fefefe
| 271095 ||  || — || August 22, 2003 || Campo Imperatore || CINEOS || — || align=right data-sort-value="0.91" | 910 m || 
|-id=096 bgcolor=#d6d6d6
| 271096 ||  || — || August 20, 2003 || Saint-Sulpice || Saint-Sulpice Obs. || — || align=right | 2.6 km || 
|-id=097 bgcolor=#E9E9E9
| 271097 ||  || — || August 26, 2003 || Socorro || LINEAR || — || align=right | 3.2 km || 
|-id=098 bgcolor=#E9E9E9
| 271098 ||  || — || August 24, 2003 || Socorro || LINEAR || GEF || align=right | 2.0 km || 
|-id=099 bgcolor=#E9E9E9
| 271099 ||  || — || August 24, 2003 || Socorro || LINEAR || — || align=right | 3.6 km || 
|-id=100 bgcolor=#d6d6d6
| 271100 ||  || — || August 27, 2003 || Palomar || NEAT || — || align=right | 3.8 km || 
|}

271101–271200 

|-bgcolor=#E9E9E9
| 271101 ||  || — || August 28, 2003 || Haleakala || NEAT || — || align=right | 2.7 km || 
|-id=102 bgcolor=#E9E9E9
| 271102 ||  || — || August 30, 2003 || Haleakala || NEAT || — || align=right | 4.0 km || 
|-id=103 bgcolor=#d6d6d6
| 271103 ||  || — || August 30, 2003 || Kitt Peak || Spacewatch || 629 || align=right | 1.7 km || 
|-id=104 bgcolor=#fefefe
| 271104 ||  || — || August 28, 2003 || Haleakala || NEAT || — || align=right | 1.1 km || 
|-id=105 bgcolor=#E9E9E9
| 271105 ||  || — || August 29, 2003 || Haleakala || NEAT || — || align=right | 3.3 km || 
|-id=106 bgcolor=#d6d6d6
| 271106 ||  || — || August 23, 2003 || Campo Imperatore || CINEOS || — || align=right | 3.3 km || 
|-id=107 bgcolor=#E9E9E9
| 271107 ||  || — || September 2, 2003 || Haleakala || NEAT || — || align=right | 3.0 km || 
|-id=108 bgcolor=#d6d6d6
| 271108 ||  || — || September 3, 2003 || Socorro || LINEAR || — || align=right | 5.0 km || 
|-id=109 bgcolor=#E9E9E9
| 271109 ||  || — || September 13, 2003 || Great Shefford || P. Birtwhistle || BAR || align=right | 1.5 km || 
|-id=110 bgcolor=#E9E9E9
| 271110 ||  || — || September 15, 2003 || Wrightwood || J. W. Young || AGN || align=right | 1.5 km || 
|-id=111 bgcolor=#E9E9E9
| 271111 ||  || — || September 15, 2003 || Palomar || NEAT || — || align=right | 2.7 km || 
|-id=112 bgcolor=#E9E9E9
| 271112 ||  || — || September 14, 2003 || Anderson Mesa || LONEOS || — || align=right | 3.1 km || 
|-id=113 bgcolor=#E9E9E9
| 271113 ||  || — || September 15, 2003 || Haleakala || NEAT || — || align=right | 4.1 km || 
|-id=114 bgcolor=#d6d6d6
| 271114 ||  || — || September 15, 2003 || Palomar || NEAT || — || align=right | 4.1 km || 
|-id=115 bgcolor=#d6d6d6
| 271115 ||  || — || September 16, 2003 || Kitt Peak || Spacewatch || — || align=right | 2.5 km || 
|-id=116 bgcolor=#d6d6d6
| 271116 ||  || — || September 16, 2003 || Kitt Peak || Spacewatch || 7:4 || align=right | 3.3 km || 
|-id=117 bgcolor=#E9E9E9
| 271117 ||  || — || September 16, 2003 || Kitt Peak || Spacewatch || — || align=right | 2.4 km || 
|-id=118 bgcolor=#d6d6d6
| 271118 ||  || — || September 16, 2003 || Kitt Peak || Spacewatch || — || align=right | 3.1 km || 
|-id=119 bgcolor=#fefefe
| 271119 ||  || — || September 16, 2003 || Kitt Peak || Spacewatch || V || align=right data-sort-value="0.67" | 670 m || 
|-id=120 bgcolor=#E9E9E9
| 271120 ||  || — || September 16, 2003 || Kitt Peak || Spacewatch || — || align=right | 2.5 km || 
|-id=121 bgcolor=#d6d6d6
| 271121 ||  || — || September 16, 2003 || Kitt Peak || Spacewatch || EOS || align=right | 2.0 km || 
|-id=122 bgcolor=#E9E9E9
| 271122 ||  || — || September 18, 2003 || Palomar || NEAT || WIT || align=right | 1.3 km || 
|-id=123 bgcolor=#d6d6d6
| 271123 ||  || — || September 16, 2003 || Anderson Mesa || LONEOS || BRA || align=right | 2.1 km || 
|-id=124 bgcolor=#d6d6d6
| 271124 ||  || — || September 16, 2003 || Anderson Mesa || LONEOS || — || align=right | 3.6 km || 
|-id=125 bgcolor=#d6d6d6
| 271125 ||  || — || September 17, 2003 || Kvistaberg || UDAS || — || align=right | 3.7 km || 
|-id=126 bgcolor=#fefefe
| 271126 ||  || — || September 19, 2003 || Palomar || NEAT || — || align=right | 1.1 km || 
|-id=127 bgcolor=#E9E9E9
| 271127 ||  || — || September 16, 2003 || Kitt Peak || Spacewatch || — || align=right | 3.0 km || 
|-id=128 bgcolor=#E9E9E9
| 271128 ||  || — || September 17, 2003 || Socorro || LINEAR || NEM || align=right | 3.3 km || 
|-id=129 bgcolor=#E9E9E9
| 271129 ||  || — || September 17, 2003 || Kitt Peak || Spacewatch || — || align=right | 3.9 km || 
|-id=130 bgcolor=#d6d6d6
| 271130 ||  || — || September 17, 2003 || Campo Imperatore || CINEOS || — || align=right | 5.3 km || 
|-id=131 bgcolor=#d6d6d6
| 271131 ||  || — || September 18, 2003 || Kitt Peak || Spacewatch || — || align=right | 3.2 km || 
|-id=132 bgcolor=#fefefe
| 271132 ||  || — || September 18, 2003 || Kitt Peak || Spacewatch || — || align=right data-sort-value="0.79" | 790 m || 
|-id=133 bgcolor=#d6d6d6
| 271133 ||  || — || September 19, 2003 || Uccle || Uccle Obs. || EOS || align=right | 2.4 km || 
|-id=134 bgcolor=#E9E9E9
| 271134 ||  || — || September 19, 2003 || Kitt Peak || Spacewatch || — || align=right | 2.3 km || 
|-id=135 bgcolor=#d6d6d6
| 271135 ||  || — || September 20, 2003 || Palomar || NEAT || EOS || align=right | 2.9 km || 
|-id=136 bgcolor=#E9E9E9
| 271136 ||  || — || September 19, 2003 || Haleakala || NEAT || GEF || align=right | 1.4 km || 
|-id=137 bgcolor=#E9E9E9
| 271137 ||  || — || September 16, 2003 || Kitt Peak || Spacewatch || — || align=right | 2.4 km || 
|-id=138 bgcolor=#d6d6d6
| 271138 ||  || — || September 16, 2003 || Kitt Peak || Spacewatch || — || align=right | 2.4 km || 
|-id=139 bgcolor=#d6d6d6
| 271139 ||  || — || January 12, 2000 || Kitt Peak || Spacewatch || EOS || align=right | 2.6 km || 
|-id=140 bgcolor=#d6d6d6
| 271140 ||  || — || September 19, 2003 || Kitt Peak || Spacewatch || — || align=right | 4.4 km || 
|-id=141 bgcolor=#d6d6d6
| 271141 ||  || — || September 18, 2003 || Palomar || NEAT || CHA || align=right | 2.7 km || 
|-id=142 bgcolor=#d6d6d6
| 271142 ||  || — || September 18, 2003 || Palomar || NEAT || CHA || align=right | 3.1 km || 
|-id=143 bgcolor=#d6d6d6
| 271143 ||  || — || September 19, 2003 || Palomar || NEAT || — || align=right | 7.2 km || 
|-id=144 bgcolor=#fefefe
| 271144 ||  || — || September 19, 2003 || Anderson Mesa || LONEOS || — || align=right data-sort-value="0.62" | 620 m || 
|-id=145 bgcolor=#d6d6d6
| 271145 ||  || — || September 19, 2003 || Kitt Peak || Spacewatch || BRA || align=right | 2.1 km || 
|-id=146 bgcolor=#d6d6d6
| 271146 ||  || — || September 18, 2003 || Palomar || NEAT || — || align=right | 5.3 km || 
|-id=147 bgcolor=#d6d6d6
| 271147 ||  || — || September 19, 2003 || Campo Imperatore || CINEOS || — || align=right | 4.4 km || 
|-id=148 bgcolor=#d6d6d6
| 271148 ||  || — || September 20, 2003 || Anderson Mesa || LONEOS || — || align=right | 4.1 km || 
|-id=149 bgcolor=#d6d6d6
| 271149 ||  || — || September 21, 2003 || Socorro || LINEAR || — || align=right | 3.7 km || 
|-id=150 bgcolor=#E9E9E9
| 271150 ||  || — || September 23, 2003 || Haleakala || NEAT || DOR || align=right | 4.7 km || 
|-id=151 bgcolor=#E9E9E9
| 271151 ||  || — || September 20, 2003 || Socorro || LINEAR || — || align=right | 4.1 km || 
|-id=152 bgcolor=#fefefe
| 271152 ||  || — || September 22, 2003 || Uccle || T. Pauwels || — || align=right data-sort-value="0.91" | 910 m || 
|-id=153 bgcolor=#d6d6d6
| 271153 ||  || — || September 18, 2003 || Palomar || NEAT || EOS || align=right | 2.3 km || 
|-id=154 bgcolor=#d6d6d6
| 271154 ||  || — || September 19, 2003 || Palomar || NEAT || — || align=right | 3.1 km || 
|-id=155 bgcolor=#fefefe
| 271155 ||  || — || September 20, 2003 || Palomar || NEAT || — || align=right data-sort-value="0.79" | 790 m || 
|-id=156 bgcolor=#fefefe
| 271156 ||  || — || September 21, 2003 || Anderson Mesa || LONEOS || — || align=right data-sort-value="0.88" | 880 m || 
|-id=157 bgcolor=#d6d6d6
| 271157 ||  || — || September 26, 2003 || Socorro || LINEAR || — || align=right | 4.5 km || 
|-id=158 bgcolor=#E9E9E9
| 271158 ||  || — || September 25, 2003 || Palomar || NEAT || DOR || align=right | 3.1 km || 
|-id=159 bgcolor=#d6d6d6
| 271159 ||  || — || September 26, 2003 || Socorro || LINEAR || — || align=right | 4.5 km || 
|-id=160 bgcolor=#d6d6d6
| 271160 ||  || — || September 26, 2003 || Socorro || LINEAR || — || align=right | 2.9 km || 
|-id=161 bgcolor=#d6d6d6
| 271161 ||  || — || September 27, 2003 || Kitt Peak || Spacewatch || — || align=right | 3.1 km || 
|-id=162 bgcolor=#d6d6d6
| 271162 ||  || — || September 24, 2003 || Palomar || NEAT || EOS || align=right | 2.7 km || 
|-id=163 bgcolor=#E9E9E9
| 271163 ||  || — || September 24, 2003 || Palomar || NEAT || HOF || align=right | 3.4 km || 
|-id=164 bgcolor=#d6d6d6
| 271164 ||  || — || September 27, 2003 || Socorro || LINEAR || EUP || align=right | 4.1 km || 
|-id=165 bgcolor=#d6d6d6
| 271165 ||  || — || September 27, 2003 || Socorro || LINEAR || — || align=right | 3.9 km || 
|-id=166 bgcolor=#E9E9E9
| 271166 ||  || — || September 28, 2003 || Kitt Peak || Spacewatch || — || align=right | 1.9 km || 
|-id=167 bgcolor=#d6d6d6
| 271167 ||  || — || September 26, 2003 || Socorro || LINEAR || — || align=right | 4.5 km || 
|-id=168 bgcolor=#d6d6d6
| 271168 ||  || — || September 27, 2003 || Kitt Peak || Spacewatch || — || align=right | 3.5 km || 
|-id=169 bgcolor=#d6d6d6
| 271169 ||  || — || September 27, 2003 || Kitt Peak || Spacewatch || EOS || align=right | 2.7 km || 
|-id=170 bgcolor=#d6d6d6
| 271170 ||  || — || September 27, 2003 || Kitt Peak || Spacewatch || 628 || align=right | 2.4 km || 
|-id=171 bgcolor=#d6d6d6
| 271171 ||  || — || September 28, 2003 || Socorro || LINEAR || — || align=right | 3.2 km || 
|-id=172 bgcolor=#d6d6d6
| 271172 ||  || — || September 28, 2003 || Socorro || LINEAR || — || align=right | 3.3 km || 
|-id=173 bgcolor=#d6d6d6
| 271173 ||  || — || September 29, 2003 || Kitt Peak || Spacewatch || — || align=right | 2.4 km || 
|-id=174 bgcolor=#fefefe
| 271174 ||  || — || September 24, 2003 || Haleakala || NEAT || FLO || align=right data-sort-value="0.83" | 830 m || 
|-id=175 bgcolor=#fefefe
| 271175 ||  || — || September 24, 2003 || Haleakala || NEAT || — || align=right data-sort-value="0.75" | 750 m || 
|-id=176 bgcolor=#d6d6d6
| 271176 ||  || — || September 28, 2003 || Pla D'Arguines || Pla D'Arguines Obs. || — || align=right | 3.6 km || 
|-id=177 bgcolor=#E9E9E9
| 271177 ||  || — || September 29, 2003 || Socorro || LINEAR || — || align=right | 3.4 km || 
|-id=178 bgcolor=#E9E9E9
| 271178 ||  || — || September 30, 2003 || Socorro || LINEAR || — || align=right | 3.1 km || 
|-id=179 bgcolor=#d6d6d6
| 271179 ||  || — || September 18, 2003 || Campo Imperatore || CINEOS || CHA || align=right | 3.3 km || 
|-id=180 bgcolor=#d6d6d6
| 271180 ||  || — || September 19, 2003 || Anderson Mesa || LONEOS || EOS || align=right | 2.5 km || 
|-id=181 bgcolor=#E9E9E9
| 271181 ||  || — || September 20, 2003 || Socorro || LINEAR || — || align=right | 3.4 km || 
|-id=182 bgcolor=#E9E9E9
| 271182 ||  || — || September 20, 2003 || Socorro || LINEAR || — || align=right | 2.7 km || 
|-id=183 bgcolor=#E9E9E9
| 271183 ||  || — || September 18, 2003 || Haleakala || NEAT || TIN || align=right data-sort-value="0.93" | 930 m || 
|-id=184 bgcolor=#d6d6d6
| 271184 ||  || — || September 18, 2003 || Haleakala || NEAT || CHA || align=right | 2.9 km || 
|-id=185 bgcolor=#d6d6d6
| 271185 ||  || — || September 17, 2003 || Palomar || NEAT || — || align=right | 3.6 km || 
|-id=186 bgcolor=#E9E9E9
| 271186 ||  || — || September 17, 2003 || Palomar || NEAT || — || align=right | 3.0 km || 
|-id=187 bgcolor=#d6d6d6
| 271187 ||  || — || September 17, 2003 || Palomar || NEAT || TIR || align=right | 2.5 km || 
|-id=188 bgcolor=#d6d6d6
| 271188 ||  || — || September 17, 2003 || Palomar || NEAT || — || align=right | 4.5 km || 
|-id=189 bgcolor=#d6d6d6
| 271189 ||  || — || September 30, 2003 || Anderson Mesa || LONEOS || — || align=right | 4.4 km || 
|-id=190 bgcolor=#fefefe
| 271190 ||  || — || September 27, 2003 || Socorro || LINEAR || — || align=right data-sort-value="0.62" | 620 m || 
|-id=191 bgcolor=#d6d6d6
| 271191 ||  || — || September 28, 2003 || Haleakala || NEAT || — || align=right | 4.3 km || 
|-id=192 bgcolor=#d6d6d6
| 271192 ||  || — || September 27, 2003 || Anderson Mesa || LONEOS || BRA || align=right | 2.2 km || 
|-id=193 bgcolor=#d6d6d6
| 271193 ||  || — || September 17, 2003 || Kitt Peak || Spacewatch || EOS || align=right | 2.8 km || 
|-id=194 bgcolor=#E9E9E9
| 271194 ||  || — || September 19, 2003 || Campo Imperatore || CINEOS || — || align=right | 2.6 km || 
|-id=195 bgcolor=#d6d6d6
| 271195 ||  || — || September 19, 2003 || Campo Imperatore || CINEOS || KOR || align=right | 1.5 km || 
|-id=196 bgcolor=#d6d6d6
| 271196 ||  || — || September 20, 2003 || Palomar || NEAT || — || align=right | 4.2 km || 
|-id=197 bgcolor=#E9E9E9
| 271197 ||  || — || September 17, 2003 || Kitt Peak || Spacewatch || — || align=right | 3.1 km || 
|-id=198 bgcolor=#d6d6d6
| 271198 ||  || — || September 20, 2003 || Kitt Peak || Spacewatch || — || align=right | 2.8 km || 
|-id=199 bgcolor=#d6d6d6
| 271199 ||  || — || September 22, 2003 || Palomar || NEAT || — || align=right | 3.3 km || 
|-id=200 bgcolor=#d6d6d6
| 271200 ||  || — || September 22, 2003 || Palomar || NEAT || EOS || align=right | 2.4 km || 
|}

271201–271300 

|-bgcolor=#d6d6d6
| 271201 ||  || — || September 26, 2003 || Apache Point || SDSS || — || align=right | 3.4 km || 
|-id=202 bgcolor=#d6d6d6
| 271202 ||  || — || September 19, 2003 || Campo Imperatore || CINEOS || — || align=right | 2.8 km || 
|-id=203 bgcolor=#d6d6d6
| 271203 ||  || — || September 23, 2003 || Palomar || NEAT || — || align=right | 3.2 km || 
|-id=204 bgcolor=#E9E9E9
| 271204 ||  || — || September 26, 2003 || Apache Point || SDSS || AGN || align=right | 1.6 km || 
|-id=205 bgcolor=#d6d6d6
| 271205 ||  || — || September 26, 2003 || Apache Point || SDSS || EOS || align=right | 2.7 km || 
|-id=206 bgcolor=#d6d6d6
| 271206 ||  || — || September 26, 2003 || Apache Point || SDSS || — || align=right | 3.4 km || 
|-id=207 bgcolor=#d6d6d6
| 271207 ||  || — || September 26, 2003 || Apache Point || SDSS || HYG || align=right | 3.1 km || 
|-id=208 bgcolor=#d6d6d6
| 271208 ||  || — || September 26, 2003 || Apache Point || SDSS || EOS || align=right | 2.2 km || 
|-id=209 bgcolor=#d6d6d6
| 271209 ||  || — || September 26, 2003 || Apache Point || SDSS || VER || align=right | 3.7 km || 
|-id=210 bgcolor=#E9E9E9
| 271210 ||  || — || September 28, 2003 || Apache Point || SDSS || AGN || align=right | 1.5 km || 
|-id=211 bgcolor=#E9E9E9
| 271211 ||  || — || September 19, 2003 || Kitt Peak || Spacewatch || HNA || align=right | 3.2 km || 
|-id=212 bgcolor=#d6d6d6
| 271212 || 2003 TC || — || October 1, 2003 || Wrightwood || A. Grigsby || — || align=right | 3.4 km || 
|-id=213 bgcolor=#E9E9E9
| 271213 ||  || — || October 1, 2003 || Anderson Mesa || LONEOS || TIN || align=right | 1.5 km || 
|-id=214 bgcolor=#E9E9E9
| 271214 ||  || — || October 3, 2003 || Haleakala || NEAT || INO || align=right | 1.9 km || 
|-id=215 bgcolor=#d6d6d6
| 271215 ||  || — || October 15, 2003 || Palomar || NEAT || THM || align=right | 2.8 km || 
|-id=216 bgcolor=#d6d6d6
| 271216 Boblambert ||  ||  || October 14, 2003 || New Milford || John J. McCarthy Obs. || — || align=right | 3.4 km || 
|-id=217 bgcolor=#d6d6d6
| 271217 ||  || — || October 15, 2003 || Anderson Mesa || LONEOS || EMA || align=right | 4.5 km || 
|-id=218 bgcolor=#d6d6d6
| 271218 ||  || — || October 15, 2003 || Anderson Mesa || LONEOS || — || align=right | 4.7 km || 
|-id=219 bgcolor=#d6d6d6
| 271219 ||  || — || October 14, 2003 || Palomar || NEAT || EOS || align=right | 2.3 km || 
|-id=220 bgcolor=#d6d6d6
| 271220 ||  || — || October 1, 2003 || Kitt Peak || Spacewatch || — || align=right | 2.7 km || 
|-id=221 bgcolor=#d6d6d6
| 271221 ||  || — || October 1, 2003 || Kitt Peak || Spacewatch || EMA || align=right | 3.6 km || 
|-id=222 bgcolor=#d6d6d6
| 271222 ||  || — || October 2, 2003 || Kitt Peak || Spacewatch || EOS || align=right | 2.8 km || 
|-id=223 bgcolor=#d6d6d6
| 271223 ||  || — || October 2, 2003 || Kitt Peak || Spacewatch || VER || align=right | 2.4 km || 
|-id=224 bgcolor=#d6d6d6
| 271224 ||  || — || October 3, 2003 || Kitt Peak || Spacewatch || — || align=right | 3.5 km || 
|-id=225 bgcolor=#d6d6d6
| 271225 ||  || — || October 3, 2003 || Kitt Peak || Spacewatch || EOS || align=right | 2.3 km || 
|-id=226 bgcolor=#d6d6d6
| 271226 ||  || — || October 3, 2003 || Kitt Peak || Spacewatch || CHA || align=right | 1.9 km || 
|-id=227 bgcolor=#d6d6d6
| 271227 ||  || — || October 5, 2003 || Kitt Peak || Spacewatch || — || align=right | 3.8 km || 
|-id=228 bgcolor=#d6d6d6
| 271228 ||  || — || October 5, 2003 || Kitt Peak || Spacewatch || — || align=right | 3.9 km || 
|-id=229 bgcolor=#d6d6d6
| 271229 ||  || — || October 5, 2003 || Kitt Peak || Spacewatch || — || align=right | 3.2 km || 
|-id=230 bgcolor=#d6d6d6
| 271230 ||  || — || October 2, 2003 || Kitt Peak || Spacewatch || EOS || align=right | 4.9 km || 
|-id=231 bgcolor=#d6d6d6
| 271231 ||  || — || October 16, 2003 || Anderson Mesa || LONEOS || — || align=right | 5.2 km || 
|-id=232 bgcolor=#E9E9E9
| 271232 ||  || — || October 16, 2003 || Kitt Peak || Spacewatch || — || align=right | 3.6 km || 
|-id=233 bgcolor=#d6d6d6
| 271233 ||  || — || October 16, 2003 || Anderson Mesa || LONEOS || — || align=right | 4.5 km || 
|-id=234 bgcolor=#d6d6d6
| 271234 ||  || — || October 17, 2003 || Anderson Mesa || LONEOS || — || align=right | 4.8 km || 
|-id=235 bgcolor=#d6d6d6
| 271235 Bellay ||  ||  || October 18, 2003 || Saint-Sulpice || Saint-Sulpice Obs. || KOR || align=right | 1.9 km || 
|-id=236 bgcolor=#d6d6d6
| 271236 ||  || — || October 16, 2003 || Palomar || NEAT || CHA || align=right | 2.6 km || 
|-id=237 bgcolor=#d6d6d6
| 271237 ||  || — || October 18, 2003 || Kitt Peak || Spacewatch || — || align=right | 2.4 km || 
|-id=238 bgcolor=#d6d6d6
| 271238 ||  || — || October 18, 2003 || Palomar || NEAT || — || align=right | 5.4 km || 
|-id=239 bgcolor=#d6d6d6
| 271239 ||  || — || October 16, 2003 || Anderson Mesa || LONEOS || — || align=right | 4.1 km || 
|-id=240 bgcolor=#d6d6d6
| 271240 ||  || — || October 16, 2003 || Anderson Mesa || LONEOS || — || align=right | 3.8 km || 
|-id=241 bgcolor=#d6d6d6
| 271241 ||  || — || October 16, 2003 || Palomar || NEAT || — || align=right | 3.5 km || 
|-id=242 bgcolor=#d6d6d6
| 271242 ||  || — || October 16, 2003 || Palomar || NEAT || TEL || align=right | 1.8 km || 
|-id=243 bgcolor=#d6d6d6
| 271243 ||  || — || October 19, 2003 || Kitt Peak || Spacewatch || — || align=right | 3.4 km || 
|-id=244 bgcolor=#d6d6d6
| 271244 ||  || — || October 19, 2003 || Kitt Peak || Spacewatch || — || align=right | 2.7 km || 
|-id=245 bgcolor=#d6d6d6
| 271245 ||  || — || October 19, 2003 || Kitt Peak || Spacewatch || EOS || align=right | 3.4 km || 
|-id=246 bgcolor=#d6d6d6
| 271246 ||  || — || October 17, 2003 || Kitt Peak || Spacewatch || — || align=right | 4.1 km || 
|-id=247 bgcolor=#d6d6d6
| 271247 ||  || — || October 17, 2003 || Kitt Peak || Spacewatch || — || align=right | 3.8 km || 
|-id=248 bgcolor=#d6d6d6
| 271248 ||  || — || October 17, 2003 || Kitt Peak || Spacewatch || TEL || align=right | 1.9 km || 
|-id=249 bgcolor=#d6d6d6
| 271249 ||  || — || October 18, 2003 || Palomar || NEAT || — || align=right | 3.8 km || 
|-id=250 bgcolor=#d6d6d6
| 271250 ||  || — || October 16, 2003 || Palomar || NEAT || TEL || align=right | 2.0 km || 
|-id=251 bgcolor=#d6d6d6
| 271251 ||  || — || October 20, 2003 || Kitt Peak || Spacewatch || HYG || align=right | 3.1 km || 
|-id=252 bgcolor=#E9E9E9
| 271252 ||  || — || October 17, 2003 || Kitt Peak || Spacewatch || — || align=right | 3.4 km || 
|-id=253 bgcolor=#d6d6d6
| 271253 ||  || — || October 19, 2003 || Kitt Peak || Spacewatch || — || align=right | 4.4 km || 
|-id=254 bgcolor=#d6d6d6
| 271254 ||  || — || October 20, 2003 || Kitt Peak || Spacewatch || — || align=right | 4.9 km || 
|-id=255 bgcolor=#d6d6d6
| 271255 ||  || — || October 18, 2003 || Kitt Peak || Spacewatch || — || align=right | 4.1 km || 
|-id=256 bgcolor=#d6d6d6
| 271256 ||  || — || October 18, 2003 || Kitt Peak || Spacewatch || — || align=right | 3.9 km || 
|-id=257 bgcolor=#d6d6d6
| 271257 ||  || — || October 19, 2003 || Kitt Peak || Spacewatch || — || align=right | 3.9 km || 
|-id=258 bgcolor=#d6d6d6
| 271258 ||  || — || October 19, 2003 || Kitt Peak || Spacewatch || URS || align=right | 4.0 km || 
|-id=259 bgcolor=#d6d6d6
| 271259 ||  || — || October 19, 2003 || Socorro || LINEAR || — || align=right | 4.5 km || 
|-id=260 bgcolor=#d6d6d6
| 271260 ||  || — || October 21, 2003 || Kitt Peak || Spacewatch || URS || align=right | 4.3 km || 
|-id=261 bgcolor=#d6d6d6
| 271261 ||  || — || October 18, 2003 || Anderson Mesa || LONEOS || CHA || align=right | 3.1 km || 
|-id=262 bgcolor=#d6d6d6
| 271262 ||  || — || October 18, 2003 || Anderson Mesa || LONEOS || — || align=right | 5.3 km || 
|-id=263 bgcolor=#d6d6d6
| 271263 ||  || — || October 18, 2003 || Palomar || NEAT || HYG || align=right | 3.9 km || 
|-id=264 bgcolor=#d6d6d6
| 271264 ||  || — || October 21, 2003 || Anderson Mesa || LONEOS || THM || align=right | 3.6 km || 
|-id=265 bgcolor=#d6d6d6
| 271265 ||  || — || October 20, 2003 || Kitt Peak || Spacewatch || — || align=right | 5.2 km || 
|-id=266 bgcolor=#d6d6d6
| 271266 ||  || — || October 22, 2003 || Socorro || LINEAR || — || align=right | 3.1 km || 
|-id=267 bgcolor=#d6d6d6
| 271267 ||  || — || October 19, 2003 || Kitt Peak || Spacewatch || — || align=right | 3.2 km || 
|-id=268 bgcolor=#d6d6d6
| 271268 ||  || — || October 20, 2003 || Socorro || LINEAR || — || align=right | 4.1 km || 
|-id=269 bgcolor=#d6d6d6
| 271269 ||  || — || October 21, 2003 || Palomar || NEAT || TIR || align=right | 4.0 km || 
|-id=270 bgcolor=#d6d6d6
| 271270 ||  || — || October 22, 2003 || Kitt Peak || Spacewatch || — || align=right | 4.1 km || 
|-id=271 bgcolor=#FA8072
| 271271 ||  || — || October 23, 2003 || Anderson Mesa || LONEOS || — || align=right data-sort-value="0.86" | 860 m || 
|-id=272 bgcolor=#d6d6d6
| 271272 ||  || — || October 23, 2003 || Anderson Mesa || LONEOS || EOS || align=right | 3.7 km || 
|-id=273 bgcolor=#d6d6d6
| 271273 ||  || — || October 21, 2003 || Kitt Peak || Spacewatch || — || align=right | 3.6 km || 
|-id=274 bgcolor=#d6d6d6
| 271274 ||  || — || October 21, 2003 || Socorro || LINEAR || URS || align=right | 4.2 km || 
|-id=275 bgcolor=#d6d6d6
| 271275 ||  || — || October 21, 2003 || Socorro || LINEAR || — || align=right | 3.2 km || 
|-id=276 bgcolor=#d6d6d6
| 271276 ||  || — || October 23, 2003 || Kitt Peak || Spacewatch || — || align=right | 3.3 km || 
|-id=277 bgcolor=#d6d6d6
| 271277 ||  || — || October 23, 2003 || Kitt Peak || Spacewatch || LIX || align=right | 4.7 km || 
|-id=278 bgcolor=#E9E9E9
| 271278 ||  || — || October 21, 2003 || Palomar || NEAT || — || align=right | 2.6 km || 
|-id=279 bgcolor=#d6d6d6
| 271279 ||  || — || October 22, 2003 || Socorro || LINEAR || TIR || align=right | 5.5 km || 
|-id=280 bgcolor=#fefefe
| 271280 ||  || — || October 23, 2003 || Anderson Mesa || LONEOS || — || align=right data-sort-value="0.95" | 950 m || 
|-id=281 bgcolor=#d6d6d6
| 271281 ||  || — || October 24, 2003 || Kitt Peak || Spacewatch || — || align=right | 4.0 km || 
|-id=282 bgcolor=#d6d6d6
| 271282 ||  || — || October 24, 2003 || Socorro || LINEAR || — || align=right | 4.3 km || 
|-id=283 bgcolor=#d6d6d6
| 271283 ||  || — || October 24, 2003 || Socorro || LINEAR || — || align=right | 4.2 km || 
|-id=284 bgcolor=#d6d6d6
| 271284 ||  || — || October 24, 2003 || Kitt Peak || Spacewatch || — || align=right | 4.1 km || 
|-id=285 bgcolor=#d6d6d6
| 271285 ||  || — || October 24, 2003 || Kitt Peak || Spacewatch || LIX || align=right | 4.1 km || 
|-id=286 bgcolor=#d6d6d6
| 271286 ||  || — || October 24, 2003 || Haleakala || NEAT || — || align=right | 5.7 km || 
|-id=287 bgcolor=#E9E9E9
| 271287 ||  || — || October 24, 2003 || Haleakala || NEAT || DOR || align=right | 4.3 km || 
|-id=288 bgcolor=#d6d6d6
| 271288 ||  || — || October 25, 2003 || Socorro || LINEAR || — || align=right | 2.6 km || 
|-id=289 bgcolor=#fefefe
| 271289 ||  || — || October 27, 2003 || Socorro || LINEAR || — || align=right data-sort-value="0.91" | 910 m || 
|-id=290 bgcolor=#d6d6d6
| 271290 ||  || — || October 28, 2003 || Socorro || LINEAR || — || align=right | 3.1 km || 
|-id=291 bgcolor=#d6d6d6
| 271291 ||  || — || October 24, 2003 || Bergisch Gladbach || W. Bickel || HYG || align=right | 2.9 km || 
|-id=292 bgcolor=#d6d6d6
| 271292 ||  || — || October 17, 2003 || Palomar || NEAT || — || align=right | 3.4 km || 
|-id=293 bgcolor=#d6d6d6
| 271293 ||  || — || October 28, 2003 || Socorro || LINEAR || EOS || align=right | 2.6 km || 
|-id=294 bgcolor=#d6d6d6
| 271294 ||  || — || October 29, 2003 || Kitt Peak || Spacewatch || — || align=right | 4.2 km || 
|-id=295 bgcolor=#d6d6d6
| 271295 ||  || — || October 25, 2003 || Socorro || LINEAR || — || align=right | 2.5 km || 
|-id=296 bgcolor=#d6d6d6
| 271296 ||  || — || October 25, 2003 || Socorro || LINEAR || EOS || align=right | 2.4 km || 
|-id=297 bgcolor=#d6d6d6
| 271297 ||  || — || October 16, 2003 || Kitt Peak || Spacewatch || KOR || align=right | 1.6 km || 
|-id=298 bgcolor=#d6d6d6
| 271298 ||  || — || October 16, 2003 || Kitt Peak || Spacewatch || — || align=right | 2.9 km || 
|-id=299 bgcolor=#d6d6d6
| 271299 ||  || — || October 17, 2003 || Kitt Peak || Spacewatch || — || align=right | 4.5 km || 
|-id=300 bgcolor=#E9E9E9
| 271300 ||  || — || October 19, 2003 || Apache Point || SDSS || — || align=right | 2.0 km || 
|}

271301–271400 

|-bgcolor=#fefefe
| 271301 ||  || — || October 16, 2003 || Kitt Peak || Spacewatch || — || align=right data-sort-value="0.72" | 720 m || 
|-id=302 bgcolor=#d6d6d6
| 271302 ||  || — || October 18, 2003 || Apache Point || SDSS || 628 || align=right | 1.7 km || 
|-id=303 bgcolor=#d6d6d6
| 271303 ||  || — || October 18, 2003 || Kitt Peak || Spacewatch || KOR || align=right | 1.5 km || 
|-id=304 bgcolor=#d6d6d6
| 271304 ||  || — || October 19, 2003 || Apache Point || SDSS || — || align=right | 2.9 km || 
|-id=305 bgcolor=#d6d6d6
| 271305 ||  || — || October 19, 2003 || Apache Point || SDSS || — || align=right | 3.0 km || 
|-id=306 bgcolor=#d6d6d6
| 271306 ||  || — || October 19, 2003 || Apache Point || SDSS || — || align=right | 2.9 km || 
|-id=307 bgcolor=#d6d6d6
| 271307 ||  || — || October 19, 2003 || Apache Point || SDSS || — || align=right | 3.9 km || 
|-id=308 bgcolor=#E9E9E9
| 271308 ||  || — || October 19, 2003 || Apache Point || SDSS || — || align=right | 1.6 km || 
|-id=309 bgcolor=#d6d6d6
| 271309 ||  || — || October 19, 2003 || Kitt Peak || Spacewatch || KOR || align=right | 1.4 km || 
|-id=310 bgcolor=#d6d6d6
| 271310 ||  || — || October 23, 2003 || Apache Point || SDSS || — || align=right | 2.9 km || 
|-id=311 bgcolor=#d6d6d6
| 271311 ||  || — || October 17, 2003 || Kitt Peak || Spacewatch || — || align=right | 3.8 km || 
|-id=312 bgcolor=#d6d6d6
| 271312 ||  || — || November 15, 2003 || Kitt Peak || Spacewatch || — || align=right | 3.5 km || 
|-id=313 bgcolor=#d6d6d6
| 271313 ||  || — || November 15, 2003 || Kitt Peak || Spacewatch || — || align=right | 2.9 km || 
|-id=314 bgcolor=#fefefe
| 271314 ||  || — || November 16, 2003 || Catalina || CSS || FLO || align=right data-sort-value="0.62" | 620 m || 
|-id=315 bgcolor=#fefefe
| 271315 ||  || — || November 16, 2003 || Kitt Peak || Spacewatch || V || align=right data-sort-value="0.76" | 760 m || 
|-id=316 bgcolor=#d6d6d6
| 271316 ||  || — || November 16, 2003 || Kitt Peak || Spacewatch || — || align=right | 3.8 km || 
|-id=317 bgcolor=#d6d6d6
| 271317 ||  || — || November 16, 2003 || Kitt Peak || Spacewatch || — || align=right | 2.8 km || 
|-id=318 bgcolor=#d6d6d6
| 271318 ||  || — || November 18, 2003 || Kitt Peak || Spacewatch || — || align=right | 3.1 km || 
|-id=319 bgcolor=#fefefe
| 271319 ||  || — || November 18, 2003 || Kitt Peak || Spacewatch || V || align=right data-sort-value="0.80" | 800 m || 
|-id=320 bgcolor=#d6d6d6
| 271320 ||  || — || November 18, 2003 || Palomar || NEAT || — || align=right | 7.5 km || 
|-id=321 bgcolor=#d6d6d6
| 271321 ||  || — || November 19, 2003 || Socorro || LINEAR || — || align=right | 3.2 km || 
|-id=322 bgcolor=#d6d6d6
| 271322 ||  || — || November 16, 2003 || Kitt Peak || Spacewatch || — || align=right | 4.0 km || 
|-id=323 bgcolor=#E9E9E9
| 271323 ||  || — || November 18, 2003 || Kitt Peak || Spacewatch || — || align=right | 3.6 km || 
|-id=324 bgcolor=#d6d6d6
| 271324 ||  || — || November 18, 2003 || Kitt Peak || Spacewatch || HYG || align=right | 3.5 km || 
|-id=325 bgcolor=#d6d6d6
| 271325 ||  || — || November 18, 2003 || Palomar || NEAT || EOS || align=right | 2.8 km || 
|-id=326 bgcolor=#fefefe
| 271326 ||  || — || November 18, 2003 || Palomar || NEAT || — || align=right data-sort-value="0.99" | 990 m || 
|-id=327 bgcolor=#d6d6d6
| 271327 ||  || — || November 18, 2003 || Palomar || NEAT || — || align=right | 3.6 km || 
|-id=328 bgcolor=#d6d6d6
| 271328 ||  || — || November 19, 2003 || Catalina || CSS || — || align=right | 3.3 km || 
|-id=329 bgcolor=#d6d6d6
| 271329 ||  || — || November 19, 2003 || Kitt Peak || Spacewatch || — || align=right | 4.2 km || 
|-id=330 bgcolor=#d6d6d6
| 271330 ||  || — || November 20, 2003 || Socorro || LINEAR || — || align=right | 5.7 km || 
|-id=331 bgcolor=#d6d6d6
| 271331 ||  || — || November 19, 2003 || Palomar || NEAT || — || align=right | 4.3 km || 
|-id=332 bgcolor=#d6d6d6
| 271332 ||  || — || November 18, 2003 || Palomar || NEAT || — || align=right | 4.8 km || 
|-id=333 bgcolor=#d6d6d6
| 271333 ||  || — || November 19, 2003 || Kitt Peak || Spacewatch || — || align=right | 2.8 km || 
|-id=334 bgcolor=#d6d6d6
| 271334 ||  || — || November 18, 2003 || Kitt Peak || Spacewatch || — || align=right | 3.4 km || 
|-id=335 bgcolor=#d6d6d6
| 271335 ||  || — || November 18, 2003 || Kitt Peak || Spacewatch || THM || align=right | 3.4 km || 
|-id=336 bgcolor=#d6d6d6
| 271336 ||  || — || November 19, 2003 || Palomar || NEAT || — || align=right | 3.7 km || 
|-id=337 bgcolor=#d6d6d6
| 271337 ||  || — || November 19, 2003 || Kitt Peak || Spacewatch || LAU || align=right | 1.8 km || 
|-id=338 bgcolor=#d6d6d6
| 271338 ||  || — || November 19, 2003 || Kitt Peak || Spacewatch || VER || align=right | 5.4 km || 
|-id=339 bgcolor=#d6d6d6
| 271339 ||  || — || November 20, 2003 || Kitt Peak || Spacewatch || — || align=right | 3.2 km || 
|-id=340 bgcolor=#d6d6d6
| 271340 ||  || — || November 21, 2003 || Socorro || LINEAR || — || align=right | 3.3 km || 
|-id=341 bgcolor=#d6d6d6
| 271341 ||  || — || November 19, 2003 || Anderson Mesa || LONEOS || — || align=right | 4.1 km || 
|-id=342 bgcolor=#d6d6d6
| 271342 ||  || — || November 20, 2003 || Socorro || LINEAR || EOS || align=right | 2.4 km || 
|-id=343 bgcolor=#d6d6d6
| 271343 ||  || — || November 20, 2003 || Socorro || LINEAR || — || align=right | 4.2 km || 
|-id=344 bgcolor=#d6d6d6
| 271344 ||  || — || November 20, 2003 || Socorro || LINEAR || EOS || align=right | 2.8 km || 
|-id=345 bgcolor=#d6d6d6
| 271345 ||  || — || November 21, 2003 || Socorro || LINEAR || BRA || align=right | 2.3 km || 
|-id=346 bgcolor=#fefefe
| 271346 ||  || — || November 21, 2003 || Socorro || LINEAR || FLO || align=right data-sort-value="0.96" | 960 m || 
|-id=347 bgcolor=#d6d6d6
| 271347 ||  || — || November 21, 2003 || Socorro || LINEAR || — || align=right | 4.8 km || 
|-id=348 bgcolor=#d6d6d6
| 271348 ||  || — || November 23, 2003 || Catalina || CSS || INA || align=right | 3.8 km || 
|-id=349 bgcolor=#fefefe
| 271349 ||  || — || November 26, 2003 || Kitt Peak || Spacewatch || — || align=right | 1.1 km || 
|-id=350 bgcolor=#d6d6d6
| 271350 ||  || — || November 26, 2003 || Kitt Peak || Spacewatch || — || align=right | 5.1 km || 
|-id=351 bgcolor=#d6d6d6
| 271351 ||  || — || November 29, 2003 || Socorro || LINEAR || — || align=right | 5.0 km || 
|-id=352 bgcolor=#d6d6d6
| 271352 ||  || — || November 30, 2003 || Kitt Peak || Spacewatch || — || align=right | 4.0 km || 
|-id=353 bgcolor=#E9E9E9
| 271353 ||  || — || November 30, 2003 || Kitt Peak || Spacewatch || HOF || align=right | 3.2 km || 
|-id=354 bgcolor=#d6d6d6
| 271354 ||  || — || November 30, 2003 || Kitt Peak || Spacewatch || THM || align=right | 2.7 km || 
|-id=355 bgcolor=#d6d6d6
| 271355 ||  || — || November 20, 2003 || Kitt Peak || Spacewatch || HYG || align=right | 3.0 km || 
|-id=356 bgcolor=#d6d6d6
| 271356 ||  || — || November 24, 2003 || Anderson Mesa || LONEOS || — || align=right | 3.9 km || 
|-id=357 bgcolor=#d6d6d6
| 271357 ||  || — || December 3, 2003 || Socorro || LINEAR || — || align=right | 6.2 km || 
|-id=358 bgcolor=#d6d6d6
| 271358 ||  || — || December 4, 2003 || Socorro || LINEAR || — || align=right | 4.6 km || 
|-id=359 bgcolor=#d6d6d6
| 271359 ||  || — || December 4, 2003 || Socorro || LINEAR || — || align=right | 6.5 km || 
|-id=360 bgcolor=#d6d6d6
| 271360 ||  || — || December 14, 2003 || Palomar || NEAT || HYG || align=right | 2.8 km || 
|-id=361 bgcolor=#d6d6d6
| 271361 ||  || — || December 15, 2003 || Socorro || LINEAR || ALA || align=right | 3.8 km || 
|-id=362 bgcolor=#d6d6d6
| 271362 ||  || — || December 1, 2003 || Kitt Peak || Spacewatch || URS || align=right | 6.1 km || 
|-id=363 bgcolor=#d6d6d6
| 271363 ||  || — || December 1, 2003 || Kitt Peak || Spacewatch || HYG || align=right | 3.0 km || 
|-id=364 bgcolor=#d6d6d6
| 271364 ||  || — || December 3, 2003 || Socorro || LINEAR || — || align=right | 5.5 km || 
|-id=365 bgcolor=#d6d6d6
| 271365 ||  || — || December 5, 2003 || Catalina || CSS || — || align=right | 5.7 km || 
|-id=366 bgcolor=#FA8072
| 271366 ||  || — || December 16, 2003 || Socorro || LINEAR || — || align=right data-sort-value="0.91" | 910 m || 
|-id=367 bgcolor=#d6d6d6
| 271367 ||  || — || December 17, 2003 || Socorro || LINEAR || — || align=right | 4.0 km || 
|-id=368 bgcolor=#FA8072
| 271368 ||  || — || December 16, 2003 || Catalina || CSS || — || align=right data-sort-value="0.93" | 930 m || 
|-id=369 bgcolor=#fefefe
| 271369 ||  || — || December 18, 2003 || Socorro || LINEAR || — || align=right data-sort-value="0.94" | 940 m || 
|-id=370 bgcolor=#fefefe
| 271370 ||  || — || December 19, 2003 || Kitt Peak || Spacewatch || FLO || align=right data-sort-value="0.74" | 740 m || 
|-id=371 bgcolor=#d6d6d6
| 271371 ||  || — || December 19, 2003 || Kitt Peak || Spacewatch || — || align=right | 5.2 km || 
|-id=372 bgcolor=#d6d6d6
| 271372 ||  || — || December 18, 2003 || Socorro || LINEAR || — || align=right | 4.0 km || 
|-id=373 bgcolor=#fefefe
| 271373 ||  || — || December 18, 2003 || Socorro || LINEAR || — || align=right | 1.3 km || 
|-id=374 bgcolor=#d6d6d6
| 271374 ||  || — || December 19, 2003 || Kitt Peak || Spacewatch || URS || align=right | 4.9 km || 
|-id=375 bgcolor=#d6d6d6
| 271375 ||  || — || December 21, 2003 || Socorro || LINEAR || — || align=right | 5.8 km || 
|-id=376 bgcolor=#d6d6d6
| 271376 ||  || — || December 25, 2003 || Haleakala || NEAT || — || align=right | 3.4 km || 
|-id=377 bgcolor=#d6d6d6
| 271377 ||  || — || December 27, 2003 || Socorro || LINEAR || — || align=right | 5.2 km || 
|-id=378 bgcolor=#fefefe
| 271378 ||  || — || December 27, 2003 || Socorro || LINEAR || PHO || align=right | 1.9 km || 
|-id=379 bgcolor=#d6d6d6
| 271379 ||  || — || December 29, 2003 || Kitt Peak || Spacewatch || — || align=right | 4.6 km || 
|-id=380 bgcolor=#fefefe
| 271380 ||  || — || December 17, 2003 || Socorro || LINEAR || — || align=right data-sort-value="0.90" | 900 m || 
|-id=381 bgcolor=#d6d6d6
| 271381 ||  || — || December 17, 2003 || Socorro || LINEAR || CRO || align=right | 4.5 km || 
|-id=382 bgcolor=#fefefe
| 271382 ||  || — || January 16, 2004 || Kitt Peak || Spacewatch || — || align=right data-sort-value="0.95" | 950 m || 
|-id=383 bgcolor=#fefefe
| 271383 ||  || — || January 16, 2004 || Kitt Peak || Spacewatch || FLO || align=right data-sort-value="0.74" | 740 m || 
|-id=384 bgcolor=#fefefe
| 271384 ||  || — || January 17, 2004 || Palomar || NEAT || — || align=right data-sort-value="0.82" | 820 m || 
|-id=385 bgcolor=#fefefe
| 271385 ||  || — || January 17, 2004 || Palomar || NEAT || FLO || align=right data-sort-value="0.80" | 800 m || 
|-id=386 bgcolor=#fefefe
| 271386 ||  || — || January 21, 2004 || Socorro || LINEAR || NYS || align=right data-sort-value="0.82" | 820 m || 
|-id=387 bgcolor=#fefefe
| 271387 ||  || — || January 22, 2004 || Socorro || LINEAR || FLO || align=right data-sort-value="0.79" | 790 m || 
|-id=388 bgcolor=#fefefe
| 271388 ||  || — || January 22, 2004 || Socorro || LINEAR || — || align=right data-sort-value="0.78" | 780 m || 
|-id=389 bgcolor=#fefefe
| 271389 ||  || — || January 24, 2004 || Socorro || LINEAR || FLO || align=right data-sort-value="0.73" | 730 m || 
|-id=390 bgcolor=#fefefe
| 271390 ||  || — || January 22, 2004 || Socorro || LINEAR || — || align=right | 2.6 km || 
|-id=391 bgcolor=#fefefe
| 271391 ||  || — || January 23, 2004 || Anderson Mesa || LONEOS || — || align=right data-sort-value="0.81" | 810 m || 
|-id=392 bgcolor=#fefefe
| 271392 ||  || — || January 27, 2004 || Kitt Peak || Spacewatch || — || align=right data-sort-value="0.92" | 920 m || 
|-id=393 bgcolor=#fefefe
| 271393 ||  || — || January 18, 2004 || Palomar || NEAT || — || align=right | 1.0 km || 
|-id=394 bgcolor=#fefefe
| 271394 ||  || — || January 22, 2004 || Mauna Kea || Mauna Kea Obs. || — || align=right data-sort-value="0.65" | 650 m || 
|-id=395 bgcolor=#fefefe
| 271395 || 2004 CU || — || February 10, 2004 || Desert Eagle || W. K. Y. Yeung || — || align=right data-sort-value="0.98" | 980 m || 
|-id=396 bgcolor=#fefefe
| 271396 ||  || — || February 10, 2004 || Palomar || NEAT || — || align=right | 1.0 km || 
|-id=397 bgcolor=#fefefe
| 271397 ||  || — || February 10, 2004 || Palomar || NEAT || FLO || align=right data-sort-value="0.90" | 900 m || 
|-id=398 bgcolor=#fefefe
| 271398 ||  || — || February 10, 2004 || Palomar || NEAT || FLO || align=right data-sort-value="0.79" | 790 m || 
|-id=399 bgcolor=#fefefe
| 271399 ||  || — || February 11, 2004 || Kitt Peak || Spacewatch || — || align=right | 1.0 km || 
|-id=400 bgcolor=#fefefe
| 271400 ||  || — || February 11, 2004 || Palomar || NEAT || — || align=right | 1.0 km || 
|}

271401–271500 

|-bgcolor=#fefefe
| 271401 ||  || — || February 11, 2004 || Kitt Peak || Spacewatch || — || align=right data-sort-value="0.73" | 730 m || 
|-id=402 bgcolor=#fefefe
| 271402 ||  || — || February 13, 2004 || Kitt Peak || Spacewatch || FLO || align=right data-sort-value="0.52" | 520 m || 
|-id=403 bgcolor=#fefefe
| 271403 ||  || — || February 11, 2004 || Kitt Peak || Spacewatch || — || align=right data-sort-value="0.83" | 830 m || 
|-id=404 bgcolor=#fefefe
| 271404 ||  || — || February 12, 2004 || Kitt Peak || Spacewatch || — || align=right data-sort-value="0.90" | 900 m || 
|-id=405 bgcolor=#fefefe
| 271405 ||  || — || February 14, 2004 || Kitt Peak || Spacewatch || — || align=right data-sort-value="0.81" | 810 m || 
|-id=406 bgcolor=#fefefe
| 271406 ||  || — || February 14, 2004 || Kitt Peak || Spacewatch || FLO || align=right data-sort-value="0.71" | 710 m || 
|-id=407 bgcolor=#fefefe
| 271407 ||  || — || February 14, 2004 || Kitt Peak || Spacewatch || — || align=right | 1.2 km || 
|-id=408 bgcolor=#fefefe
| 271408 ||  || — || February 11, 2004 || Palomar || NEAT || — || align=right | 1.2 km || 
|-id=409 bgcolor=#fefefe
| 271409 ||  || — || February 13, 2004 || Palomar || NEAT || — || align=right | 1.1 km || 
|-id=410 bgcolor=#fefefe
| 271410 ||  || — || February 14, 2004 || Kitt Peak || Spacewatch || — || align=right | 1.1 km || 
|-id=411 bgcolor=#fefefe
| 271411 ||  || — || February 13, 2004 || Kitt Peak || Spacewatch || NYS || align=right data-sort-value="0.80" | 800 m || 
|-id=412 bgcolor=#fefefe
| 271412 ||  || — || February 14, 2004 || Kitt Peak || Spacewatch || — || align=right data-sort-value="0.85" | 850 m || 
|-id=413 bgcolor=#fefefe
| 271413 ||  || — || February 15, 2004 || Palomar || NEAT || FLO || align=right data-sort-value="0.74" | 740 m || 
|-id=414 bgcolor=#fefefe
| 271414 ||  || — || February 15, 2004 || Catalina || CSS || FLO || align=right data-sort-value="0.89" | 890 m || 
|-id=415 bgcolor=#fefefe
| 271415 ||  || — || February 15, 2004 || Catalina || CSS || FLO || align=right data-sort-value="0.81" | 810 m || 
|-id=416 bgcolor=#E9E9E9
| 271416 ||  || — || February 14, 2004 || Kitt Peak || Spacewatch || — || align=right | 1.3 km || 
|-id=417 bgcolor=#fefefe
| 271417 ||  || — || February 14, 2004 || Kitt Peak || Spacewatch || — || align=right data-sort-value="0.95" | 950 m || 
|-id=418 bgcolor=#fefefe
| 271418 ||  || — || February 13, 2004 || Anderson Mesa || LONEOS || — || align=right data-sort-value="0.86" | 860 m || 
|-id=419 bgcolor=#E9E9E9
| 271419 ||  || — || February 2, 2004 || Anderson Mesa || LONEOS || MAR || align=right | 1.5 km || 
|-id=420 bgcolor=#fefefe
| 271420 ||  || — || February 13, 2004 || Kitt Peak || Spacewatch || — || align=right data-sort-value="0.84" | 840 m || 
|-id=421 bgcolor=#fefefe
| 271421 ||  || — || February 14, 2004 || Palomar || NEAT || — || align=right data-sort-value="0.73" | 730 m || 
|-id=422 bgcolor=#fefefe
| 271422 ||  || — || February 17, 2004 || Socorro || LINEAR || NYS || align=right data-sort-value="0.84" | 840 m || 
|-id=423 bgcolor=#fefefe
| 271423 ||  || — || February 17, 2004 || Kitt Peak || Spacewatch || — || align=right | 1.0 km || 
|-id=424 bgcolor=#fefefe
| 271424 ||  || — || February 17, 2004 || Socorro || LINEAR || — || align=right | 2.2 km || 
|-id=425 bgcolor=#fefefe
| 271425 ||  || — || February 17, 2004 || Haleakala || NEAT || FLO || align=right | 1.1 km || 
|-id=426 bgcolor=#fefefe
| 271426 ||  || — || February 16, 2004 || Catalina || CSS || — || align=right | 1.6 km || 
|-id=427 bgcolor=#fefefe
| 271427 ||  || — || February 17, 2004 || Socorro || LINEAR || FLO || align=right data-sort-value="0.78" | 780 m || 
|-id=428 bgcolor=#fefefe
| 271428 ||  || — || February 17, 2004 || Socorro || LINEAR || — || align=right data-sort-value="0.86" | 860 m || 
|-id=429 bgcolor=#fefefe
| 271429 ||  || — || February 19, 2004 || Socorro || LINEAR || — || align=right | 1.1 km || 
|-id=430 bgcolor=#fefefe
| 271430 ||  || — || February 17, 2004 || Socorro || LINEAR || — || align=right data-sort-value="0.88" | 880 m || 
|-id=431 bgcolor=#fefefe
| 271431 ||  || — || February 20, 2004 || Haleakala || NEAT || FLO || align=right data-sort-value="0.89" | 890 m || 
|-id=432 bgcolor=#fefefe
| 271432 ||  || — || February 22, 2004 || Kitt Peak || Spacewatch || V || align=right data-sort-value="0.76" | 760 m || 
|-id=433 bgcolor=#fefefe
| 271433 ||  || — || February 22, 2004 || Kitt Peak || Spacewatch || — || align=right data-sort-value="0.93" | 930 m || 
|-id=434 bgcolor=#fefefe
| 271434 ||  || — || February 18, 2004 || Socorro || LINEAR || — || align=right | 1.0 km || 
|-id=435 bgcolor=#fefefe
| 271435 ||  || — || February 17, 2004 || Haleakala || NEAT || — || align=right | 1.1 km || 
|-id=436 bgcolor=#fefefe
| 271436 ||  || — || February 23, 2004 || Socorro || LINEAR || — || align=right data-sort-value="0.72" | 720 m || 
|-id=437 bgcolor=#fefefe
| 271437 ||  || — || February 23, 2004 || Socorro || LINEAR || NYS || align=right data-sort-value="0.89" | 890 m || 
|-id=438 bgcolor=#fefefe
| 271438 ||  || — || February 22, 2004 || Kitt Peak || Spacewatch || NYS || align=right data-sort-value="0.62" | 620 m || 
|-id=439 bgcolor=#fefefe
| 271439 ||  || — || February 26, 2004 || Socorro || LINEAR || — || align=right data-sort-value="0.64" | 640 m || 
|-id=440 bgcolor=#d6d6d6
| 271440 ||  || — || February 26, 2004 || Socorro || LINEAR || SHU3:2 || align=right | 5.9 km || 
|-id=441 bgcolor=#fefefe
| 271441 ||  || — || February 25, 2004 || Socorro || LINEAR || — || align=right data-sort-value="0.84" | 840 m || 
|-id=442 bgcolor=#fefefe
| 271442 ||  || — || February 17, 2004 || Kitt Peak || Spacewatch || V || align=right data-sort-value="0.75" | 750 m || 
|-id=443 bgcolor=#fefefe
| 271443 ||  || — || March 11, 2004 || Palomar || NEAT || FLO || align=right data-sort-value="0.94" | 940 m || 
|-id=444 bgcolor=#fefefe
| 271444 ||  || — || March 12, 2004 || Palomar || NEAT || V || align=right data-sort-value="0.90" | 900 m || 
|-id=445 bgcolor=#fefefe
| 271445 ||  || — || March 11, 2004 || Palomar || NEAT || — || align=right | 1.3 km || 
|-id=446 bgcolor=#fefefe
| 271446 ||  || — || March 11, 2004 || Palomar || NEAT || — || align=right | 1.1 km || 
|-id=447 bgcolor=#fefefe
| 271447 ||  || — || March 12, 2004 || Palomar || NEAT || FLO || align=right data-sort-value="0.94" | 940 m || 
|-id=448 bgcolor=#fefefe
| 271448 ||  || — || March 15, 2004 || Socorro || LINEAR || V || align=right data-sort-value="0.79" | 790 m || 
|-id=449 bgcolor=#fefefe
| 271449 ||  || — || March 14, 2004 || Kitt Peak || Spacewatch || FLO || align=right data-sort-value="0.87" | 870 m || 
|-id=450 bgcolor=#fefefe
| 271450 ||  || — || March 13, 2004 || Palomar || NEAT || — || align=right | 1.0 km || 
|-id=451 bgcolor=#fefefe
| 271451 ||  || — || March 15, 2004 || Kitt Peak || Spacewatch || NYS || align=right data-sort-value="0.84" | 840 m || 
|-id=452 bgcolor=#fefefe
| 271452 ||  || — || March 15, 2004 || Kitt Peak || Spacewatch || V || align=right data-sort-value="0.84" | 840 m || 
|-id=453 bgcolor=#fefefe
| 271453 ||  || — || March 15, 2004 || Kitt Peak || Spacewatch || — || align=right data-sort-value="0.94" | 940 m || 
|-id=454 bgcolor=#fefefe
| 271454 ||  || — || March 15, 2004 || Socorro || LINEAR || FLO || align=right | 1.1 km || 
|-id=455 bgcolor=#fefefe
| 271455 ||  || — || March 15, 2004 || Catalina || CSS || NYS || align=right | 2.0 km || 
|-id=456 bgcolor=#fefefe
| 271456 ||  || — || March 15, 2004 || Catalina || CSS || — || align=right | 1.2 km || 
|-id=457 bgcolor=#fefefe
| 271457 ||  || — || March 12, 2004 || Palomar || NEAT || — || align=right data-sort-value="0.84" | 840 m || 
|-id=458 bgcolor=#fefefe
| 271458 ||  || — || March 13, 2004 || Palomar || NEAT || FLO || align=right | 1.2 km || 
|-id=459 bgcolor=#fefefe
| 271459 ||  || — || March 15, 2004 || Kitt Peak || Spacewatch || — || align=right | 2.5 km || 
|-id=460 bgcolor=#fefefe
| 271460 ||  || — || March 15, 2004 || Kitt Peak || Spacewatch || — || align=right data-sort-value="0.84" | 840 m || 
|-id=461 bgcolor=#fefefe
| 271461 ||  || — || March 15, 2004 || Catalina || CSS || — || align=right | 1.2 km || 
|-id=462 bgcolor=#fefefe
| 271462 ||  || — || March 15, 2004 || Kitt Peak || Spacewatch || V || align=right data-sort-value="0.83" | 830 m || 
|-id=463 bgcolor=#fefefe
| 271463 ||  || — || March 15, 2004 || Socorro || LINEAR || — || align=right | 1.2 km || 
|-id=464 bgcolor=#fefefe
| 271464 ||  || — || March 15, 2004 || Socorro || LINEAR || — || align=right | 1.2 km || 
|-id=465 bgcolor=#fefefe
| 271465 ||  || — || March 15, 2004 || Socorro || LINEAR || — || align=right | 1.0 km || 
|-id=466 bgcolor=#fefefe
| 271466 ||  || — || March 15, 2004 || Socorro || LINEAR || FLO || align=right | 1.1 km || 
|-id=467 bgcolor=#fefefe
| 271467 ||  || — || March 15, 2004 || Kitt Peak || Spacewatch || FLO || align=right data-sort-value="0.80" | 800 m || 
|-id=468 bgcolor=#fefefe
| 271468 ||  || — || March 15, 2004 || Socorro || LINEAR || — || align=right | 1.7 km || 
|-id=469 bgcolor=#fefefe
| 271469 ||  || — || March 15, 2004 || Kitt Peak || Spacewatch || FLO || align=right | 2.0 km || 
|-id=470 bgcolor=#d6d6d6
| 271470 ||  || — || March 14, 2004 || Kitt Peak || Spacewatch || — || align=right | 3.2 km || 
|-id=471 bgcolor=#fefefe
| 271471 ||  || — || March 15, 2004 || Kitt Peak || Spacewatch || FLO || align=right data-sort-value="0.69" | 690 m || 
|-id=472 bgcolor=#fefefe
| 271472 ||  || — || March 15, 2004 || Kitt Peak || Spacewatch || — || align=right data-sort-value="0.76" | 760 m || 
|-id=473 bgcolor=#fefefe
| 271473 ||  || — || March 19, 2004 || Socorro || LINEAR || — || align=right | 1.1 km || 
|-id=474 bgcolor=#fefefe
| 271474 ||  || — || March 24, 2004 || Wrightwood || J. W. Young || — || align=right | 1.2 km || 
|-id=475 bgcolor=#fefefe
| 271475 ||  || — || March 16, 2004 || Catalina || CSS || — || align=right | 1.4 km || 
|-id=476 bgcolor=#fefefe
| 271476 ||  || — || November 14, 2002 || Palomar || NEAT || — || align=right | 1.2 km || 
|-id=477 bgcolor=#fefefe
| 271477 ||  || — || March 16, 2004 || Catalina || CSS || — || align=right | 1.2 km || 
|-id=478 bgcolor=#fefefe
| 271478 ||  || — || March 17, 2004 || Kitt Peak || Spacewatch || — || align=right data-sort-value="0.86" | 860 m || 
|-id=479 bgcolor=#fefefe
| 271479 ||  || — || March 17, 2004 || Kitt Peak || Spacewatch || — || align=right data-sort-value="0.84" | 840 m || 
|-id=480 bgcolor=#FFC2E0
| 271480 ||  || — || March 31, 2004 || Anderson Mesa || LONEOS || APO +1km || align=right data-sort-value="0.71" | 710 m || 
|-id=481 bgcolor=#fefefe
| 271481 ||  || — || March 16, 2004 || Kitt Peak || Spacewatch || FLO || align=right data-sort-value="0.77" | 770 m || 
|-id=482 bgcolor=#fefefe
| 271482 ||  || — || March 16, 2004 || Socorro || LINEAR || V || align=right data-sort-value="0.84" | 840 m || 
|-id=483 bgcolor=#fefefe
| 271483 ||  || — || March 18, 2004 || Socorro || LINEAR || NYS || align=right data-sort-value="0.74" | 740 m || 
|-id=484 bgcolor=#fefefe
| 271484 ||  || — || March 18, 2004 || Socorro || LINEAR || — || align=right | 1.1 km || 
|-id=485 bgcolor=#fefefe
| 271485 ||  || — || March 18, 2004 || Socorro || LINEAR || NYS || align=right data-sort-value="0.88" | 880 m || 
|-id=486 bgcolor=#fefefe
| 271486 ||  || — || March 18, 2004 || Socorro || LINEAR || — || align=right data-sort-value="0.75" | 750 m || 
|-id=487 bgcolor=#fefefe
| 271487 ||  || — || March 18, 2004 || Socorro || LINEAR || — || align=right data-sort-value="0.84" | 840 m || 
|-id=488 bgcolor=#fefefe
| 271488 ||  || — || March 18, 2004 || Kitt Peak || Spacewatch || — || align=right data-sort-value="0.87" | 870 m || 
|-id=489 bgcolor=#fefefe
| 271489 ||  || — || March 20, 2004 || Socorro || LINEAR || V || align=right data-sort-value="0.71" | 710 m || 
|-id=490 bgcolor=#fefefe
| 271490 ||  || — || March 19, 2004 || Socorro || LINEAR || — || align=right | 1.2 km || 
|-id=491 bgcolor=#fefefe
| 271491 ||  || — || March 17, 2004 || Kitt Peak || Spacewatch || — || align=right data-sort-value="0.83" | 830 m || 
|-id=492 bgcolor=#d6d6d6
| 271492 ||  || — || March 16, 2004 || Socorro || LINEAR || — || align=right | 3.8 km || 
|-id=493 bgcolor=#fefefe
| 271493 ||  || — || March 20, 2004 || Kitt Peak || Spacewatch || ERI || align=right | 1.3 km || 
|-id=494 bgcolor=#fefefe
| 271494 ||  || — || March 18, 2004 || Socorro || LINEAR || — || align=right data-sort-value="0.99" | 990 m || 
|-id=495 bgcolor=#fefefe
| 271495 ||  || — || March 22, 2004 || Socorro || LINEAR || — || align=right | 1.6 km || 
|-id=496 bgcolor=#d6d6d6
| 271496 ||  || — || March 19, 2004 || Socorro || LINEAR || THM || align=right | 2.9 km || 
|-id=497 bgcolor=#fefefe
| 271497 ||  || — || March 19, 2004 || Kitt Peak || Spacewatch || — || align=right | 1.1 km || 
|-id=498 bgcolor=#fefefe
| 271498 ||  || — || March 23, 2004 || Socorro || LINEAR || FLO || align=right data-sort-value="0.87" | 870 m || 
|-id=499 bgcolor=#fefefe
| 271499 ||  || — || March 25, 2004 || Anderson Mesa || LONEOS || — || align=right | 1.5 km || 
|-id=500 bgcolor=#fefefe
| 271500 ||  || — || March 26, 2004 || Socorro || LINEAR || — || align=right | 1.3 km || 
|}

271501–271600 

|-bgcolor=#fefefe
| 271501 ||  || — || March 26, 2004 || Socorro || LINEAR || FLO || align=right data-sort-value="0.82" | 820 m || 
|-id=502 bgcolor=#fefefe
| 271502 ||  || — || March 27, 2004 || Socorro || LINEAR || FLO || align=right data-sort-value="0.64" | 640 m || 
|-id=503 bgcolor=#fefefe
| 271503 ||  || — || March 23, 2004 || Kitt Peak || Spacewatch || V || align=right data-sort-value="0.57" | 570 m || 
|-id=504 bgcolor=#fefefe
| 271504 ||  || — || March 25, 2004 || Anderson Mesa || LONEOS || — || align=right | 1.1 km || 
|-id=505 bgcolor=#fefefe
| 271505 ||  || — || March 27, 2004 || Socorro || LINEAR || — || align=right | 1.3 km || 
|-id=506 bgcolor=#fefefe
| 271506 ||  || — || March 27, 2004 || Socorro || LINEAR || FLO || align=right | 1.1 km || 
|-id=507 bgcolor=#fefefe
| 271507 ||  || — || March 27, 2004 || Socorro || LINEAR || — || align=right | 1.3 km || 
|-id=508 bgcolor=#fefefe
| 271508 ||  || — || March 26, 2004 || Socorro || LINEAR || — || align=right | 1.3 km || 
|-id=509 bgcolor=#E9E9E9
| 271509 ||  || — || March 26, 2004 || Socorro || LINEAR || — || align=right | 1.3 km || 
|-id=510 bgcolor=#fefefe
| 271510 ||  || — || March 27, 2004 || Socorro || LINEAR || — || align=right | 1.1 km || 
|-id=511 bgcolor=#fefefe
| 271511 ||  || — || March 30, 2004 || Kitt Peak || Spacewatch || NYS || align=right data-sort-value="0.56" | 560 m || 
|-id=512 bgcolor=#fefefe
| 271512 ||  || — || April 11, 2004 || Catalina || CSS || — || align=right | 1.1 km || 
|-id=513 bgcolor=#fefefe
| 271513 ||  || — || April 13, 2004 || Palomar || NEAT || — || align=right data-sort-value="0.91" | 910 m || 
|-id=514 bgcolor=#fefefe
| 271514 ||  || — || April 9, 2004 || Siding Spring || SSS || — || align=right data-sort-value="0.78" | 780 m || 
|-id=515 bgcolor=#fefefe
| 271515 ||  || — || April 12, 2004 || Anderson Mesa || LONEOS || FLO || align=right data-sort-value="0.79" | 790 m || 
|-id=516 bgcolor=#fefefe
| 271516 ||  || — || April 12, 2004 || Anderson Mesa || LONEOS || NYS || align=right data-sort-value="0.73" | 730 m || 
|-id=517 bgcolor=#fefefe
| 271517 ||  || — || April 13, 2004 || Catalina || CSS || V || align=right data-sort-value="0.89" | 890 m || 
|-id=518 bgcolor=#FA8072
| 271518 ||  || — || April 14, 2004 || Anderson Mesa || LONEOS || PHO || align=right | 1.1 km || 
|-id=519 bgcolor=#FA8072
| 271519 ||  || — || April 15, 2004 || Anderson Mesa || LONEOS || — || align=right | 1.3 km || 
|-id=520 bgcolor=#fefefe
| 271520 ||  || — || April 12, 2004 || Kitt Peak || Spacewatch || FLO || align=right data-sort-value="0.87" | 870 m || 
|-id=521 bgcolor=#fefefe
| 271521 ||  || — || April 12, 2004 || Kitt Peak || Spacewatch || — || align=right | 1.1 km || 
|-id=522 bgcolor=#fefefe
| 271522 ||  || — || April 12, 2004 || Kitt Peak || Spacewatch || — || align=right | 1.1 km || 
|-id=523 bgcolor=#fefefe
| 271523 ||  || — || April 14, 2004 || Kitt Peak || Spacewatch || — || align=right | 1.3 km || 
|-id=524 bgcolor=#fefefe
| 271524 ||  || — || April 14, 2004 || Kitt Peak || Spacewatch || — || align=right data-sort-value="0.88" | 880 m || 
|-id=525 bgcolor=#fefefe
| 271525 ||  || — || April 13, 2004 || Kitt Peak || Spacewatch || — || align=right data-sort-value="0.84" | 840 m || 
|-id=526 bgcolor=#fefefe
| 271526 ||  || — || April 11, 2004 || Palomar || NEAT || FLO || align=right data-sort-value="0.84" | 840 m || 
|-id=527 bgcolor=#fefefe
| 271527 ||  || — || April 15, 2004 || Palomar || NEAT || V || align=right data-sort-value="0.97" | 970 m || 
|-id=528 bgcolor=#fefefe
| 271528 ||  || — || April 17, 2004 || Socorro || LINEAR || FLO || align=right data-sort-value="0.94" | 940 m || 
|-id=529 bgcolor=#fefefe
| 271529 ||  || — || April 17, 2004 || Socorro || LINEAR || ERI || align=right | 3.1 km || 
|-id=530 bgcolor=#fefefe
| 271530 ||  || — || April 17, 2004 || Siding Spring || SSS || ERI || align=right | 1.7 km || 
|-id=531 bgcolor=#fefefe
| 271531 ||  || — || April 19, 2004 || Socorro || LINEAR || — || align=right | 1.5 km || 
|-id=532 bgcolor=#fefefe
| 271532 ||  || — || April 20, 2004 || Socorro || LINEAR || FLO || align=right data-sort-value="0.84" | 840 m || 
|-id=533 bgcolor=#FA8072
| 271533 ||  || — || April 17, 2004 || Anderson Mesa || LONEOS || — || align=right | 2.2 km || 
|-id=534 bgcolor=#fefefe
| 271534 ||  || — || April 21, 2004 || Socorro || LINEAR || V || align=right data-sort-value="0.84" | 840 m || 
|-id=535 bgcolor=#fefefe
| 271535 ||  || — || April 25, 2004 || Socorro || LINEAR || — || align=right | 1.3 km || 
|-id=536 bgcolor=#fefefe
| 271536 ||  || — || April 21, 2004 || Kitt Peak || Spacewatch || V || align=right data-sort-value="0.78" | 780 m || 
|-id=537 bgcolor=#fefefe
| 271537 ||  || — || April 23, 2004 || Catalina || CSS || — || align=right | 1.1 km || 
|-id=538 bgcolor=#fefefe
| 271538 ||  || — || May 9, 2004 || Palomar || NEAT || — || align=right | 1.3 km || 
|-id=539 bgcolor=#fefefe
| 271539 ||  || — || May 10, 2004 || Catalina || CSS || — || align=right data-sort-value="0.85" | 850 m || 
|-id=540 bgcolor=#fefefe
| 271540 ||  || — || May 11, 2004 || Anderson Mesa || LONEOS || FLO || align=right data-sort-value="0.82" | 820 m || 
|-id=541 bgcolor=#fefefe
| 271541 ||  || — || May 10, 2004 || Palomar || NEAT || — || align=right | 1.7 km || 
|-id=542 bgcolor=#fefefe
| 271542 ||  || — || May 9, 2004 || Palomar || NEAT || — || align=right data-sort-value="0.80" | 800 m || 
|-id=543 bgcolor=#fefefe
| 271543 ||  || — || May 9, 2004 || Kitt Peak || Spacewatch || — || align=right | 1.1 km || 
|-id=544 bgcolor=#fefefe
| 271544 ||  || — || May 11, 2004 || Anderson Mesa || LONEOS || V || align=right | 1.2 km || 
|-id=545 bgcolor=#fefefe
| 271545 ||  || — || May 11, 2004 || Anderson Mesa || LONEOS || NYS || align=right data-sort-value="0.79" | 790 m || 
|-id=546 bgcolor=#fefefe
| 271546 ||  || — || May 12, 2004 || Siding Spring || SSS || — || align=right | 1.3 km || 
|-id=547 bgcolor=#fefefe
| 271547 ||  || — || May 12, 2004 || Siding Spring || SSS || — || align=right | 1.1 km || 
|-id=548 bgcolor=#fefefe
| 271548 ||  || — || May 12, 2004 || Siding Spring || SSS || — || align=right | 1.1 km || 
|-id=549 bgcolor=#fefefe
| 271549 ||  || — || May 13, 2004 || Palomar || NEAT || — || align=right data-sort-value="0.93" | 930 m || 
|-id=550 bgcolor=#fefefe
| 271550 ||  || — || May 9, 2004 || Kitt Peak || Spacewatch || — || align=right | 1.0 km || 
|-id=551 bgcolor=#fefefe
| 271551 ||  || — || May 15, 2004 || Socorro || LINEAR || NYS || align=right data-sort-value="0.72" | 720 m || 
|-id=552 bgcolor=#fefefe
| 271552 ||  || — || May 15, 2004 || Socorro || LINEAR || V || align=right | 1.1 km || 
|-id=553 bgcolor=#fefefe
| 271553 ||  || — || May 15, 2004 || Socorro || LINEAR || — || align=right | 1.2 km || 
|-id=554 bgcolor=#fefefe
| 271554 ||  || — || May 15, 2004 || Socorro || LINEAR || NYS || align=right data-sort-value="0.96" | 960 m || 
|-id=555 bgcolor=#fefefe
| 271555 ||  || — || May 15, 2004 || Socorro || LINEAR || — || align=right | 1.1 km || 
|-id=556 bgcolor=#fefefe
| 271556 ||  || — || May 15, 2004 || Socorro || LINEAR || — || align=right | 1.3 km || 
|-id=557 bgcolor=#fefefe
| 271557 ||  || — || May 15, 2004 || Campo Imperatore || CINEOS || — || align=right | 1.1 km || 
|-id=558 bgcolor=#fefefe
| 271558 ||  || — || May 15, 2004 || Socorro || LINEAR || — || align=right | 1.4 km || 
|-id=559 bgcolor=#fefefe
| 271559 ||  || — || May 15, 2004 || Socorro || LINEAR || — || align=right | 1.2 km || 
|-id=560 bgcolor=#E9E9E9
| 271560 ||  || — || May 15, 2004 || Socorro || LINEAR || — || align=right | 1.3 km || 
|-id=561 bgcolor=#fefefe
| 271561 ||  || — || May 15, 2004 || Socorro || LINEAR || — || align=right | 1.3 km || 
|-id=562 bgcolor=#fefefe
| 271562 ||  || — || May 14, 2004 || Socorro || LINEAR || — || align=right | 1.1 km || 
|-id=563 bgcolor=#fefefe
| 271563 ||  || — || May 15, 2004 || Socorro || LINEAR || — || align=right | 1.1 km || 
|-id=564 bgcolor=#fefefe
| 271564 ||  || — || May 12, 2004 || Anderson Mesa || LONEOS || V || align=right data-sort-value="0.91" | 910 m || 
|-id=565 bgcolor=#fefefe
| 271565 ||  || — || May 9, 2004 || Kitt Peak || Spacewatch || — || align=right data-sort-value="0.93" | 930 m || 
|-id=566 bgcolor=#fefefe
| 271566 ||  || — || May 16, 2004 || Siding Spring || SSS || — || align=right | 1.1 km || 
|-id=567 bgcolor=#fefefe
| 271567 ||  || — || May 16, 2004 || Socorro || LINEAR || V || align=right data-sort-value="0.99" | 990 m || 
|-id=568 bgcolor=#fefefe
| 271568 ||  || — || May 19, 2004 || Needville || Needville Obs. || — || align=right | 1.0 km || 
|-id=569 bgcolor=#fefefe
| 271569 ||  || — || May 18, 2004 || Socorro || LINEAR || — || align=right | 1.0 km || 
|-id=570 bgcolor=#fefefe
| 271570 ||  || — || May 19, 2004 || Kitt Peak || Spacewatch || V || align=right data-sort-value="0.89" | 890 m || 
|-id=571 bgcolor=#fefefe
| 271571 ||  || — || May 24, 2004 || Socorro || LINEAR || — || align=right | 1.3 km || 
|-id=572 bgcolor=#fefefe
| 271572 ||  || — || June 9, 2004 || Siding Spring || SSS || V || align=right data-sort-value="0.77" | 770 m || 
|-id=573 bgcolor=#E9E9E9
| 271573 ||  || — || June 11, 2004 || Kitt Peak || Spacewatch || — || align=right | 1.6 km || 
|-id=574 bgcolor=#fefefe
| 271574 ||  || — || June 11, 2004 || Kitt Peak || Spacewatch || — || align=right | 1.3 km || 
|-id=575 bgcolor=#fefefe
| 271575 ||  || — || June 9, 2004 || Kitt Peak || Spacewatch || — || align=right data-sort-value="0.94" | 940 m || 
|-id=576 bgcolor=#fefefe
| 271576 ||  || — || June 11, 2004 || Socorro || LINEAR || — || align=right | 1.3 km || 
|-id=577 bgcolor=#fefefe
| 271577 ||  || — || June 12, 2004 || Socorro || LINEAR || — || align=right | 1.0 km || 
|-id=578 bgcolor=#fefefe
| 271578 ||  || — || June 15, 2004 || Socorro || LINEAR || — || align=right | 1.3 km || 
|-id=579 bgcolor=#fefefe
| 271579 ||  || — || June 15, 2004 || Socorro || LINEAR || — || align=right | 1.5 km || 
|-id=580 bgcolor=#fefefe
| 271580 ||  || — || June 20, 2004 || Junk Bond || D. Healy || MAS || align=right data-sort-value="0.90" | 900 m || 
|-id=581 bgcolor=#fefefe
| 271581 ||  || — || June 16, 2004 || Socorro || LINEAR || ERI || align=right | 2.2 km || 
|-id=582 bgcolor=#fefefe
| 271582 ||  || — || June 22, 2004 || Reedy Creek || J. Broughton || — || align=right | 1.3 km || 
|-id=583 bgcolor=#fefefe
| 271583 ||  || — || June 25, 2004 || Reedy Creek || J. Broughton || — || align=right | 1.4 km || 
|-id=584 bgcolor=#E9E9E9
| 271584 ||  || — || June 29, 2004 || Siding Spring || SSS || EUN || align=right | 2.0 km || 
|-id=585 bgcolor=#fefefe
| 271585 ||  || — || July 10, 2004 || Palomar || NEAT || — || align=right | 1.4 km || 
|-id=586 bgcolor=#fefefe
| 271586 ||  || — || July 9, 2004 || Palomar || NEAT || V || align=right data-sort-value="0.90" | 900 m || 
|-id=587 bgcolor=#fefefe
| 271587 ||  || — || July 11, 2004 || Socorro || LINEAR || — || align=right | 1.4 km || 
|-id=588 bgcolor=#fefefe
| 271588 ||  || — || July 11, 2004 || Socorro || LINEAR || V || align=right data-sort-value="0.88" | 880 m || 
|-id=589 bgcolor=#fefefe
| 271589 ||  || — || July 14, 2004 || Reedy Creek || J. Broughton || — || align=right | 1.5 km || 
|-id=590 bgcolor=#d6d6d6
| 271590 ||  || — || July 11, 2004 || Socorro || LINEAR || — || align=right | 4.8 km || 
|-id=591 bgcolor=#E9E9E9
| 271591 ||  || — || July 11, 2004 || Socorro || LINEAR || — || align=right | 1.4 km || 
|-id=592 bgcolor=#d6d6d6
| 271592 ||  || — || July 14, 2004 || Socorro || LINEAR || 3:2 || align=right | 5.1 km || 
|-id=593 bgcolor=#fefefe
| 271593 ||  || — || July 11, 2004 || Socorro || LINEAR || — || align=right | 1.3 km || 
|-id=594 bgcolor=#fefefe
| 271594 ||  || — || July 11, 2004 || Anderson Mesa || LONEOS || — || align=right | 1.4 km || 
|-id=595 bgcolor=#fefefe
| 271595 ||  || — || July 15, 2004 || Siding Spring || SSS || NYS || align=right data-sort-value="0.89" | 890 m || 
|-id=596 bgcolor=#fefefe
| 271596 ||  || — || July 15, 2004 || Socorro || LINEAR || — || align=right | 1.4 km || 
|-id=597 bgcolor=#E9E9E9
| 271597 ||  || — || July 16, 2004 || Socorro || LINEAR || — || align=right | 4.0 km || 
|-id=598 bgcolor=#d6d6d6
| 271598 ||  || — || July 17, 2004 || Socorro || LINEAR || HIL3:2 || align=right | 6.3 km || 
|-id=599 bgcolor=#fefefe
| 271599 ||  || — || July 16, 2004 || Socorro || LINEAR || NYS || align=right data-sort-value="0.94" | 940 m || 
|-id=600 bgcolor=#fefefe
| 271600 ||  || — || July 18, 2004 || Reedy Creek || J. Broughton || — || align=right | 1.1 km || 
|}

271601–271700 

|-bgcolor=#E9E9E9
| 271601 ||  || — || July 18, 2004 || Reedy Creek || J. Broughton || — || align=right | 2.2 km || 
|-id=602 bgcolor=#E9E9E9
| 271602 ||  || — || July 19, 2004 || Reedy Creek || J. Broughton || — || align=right | 1.3 km || 
|-id=603 bgcolor=#fefefe
| 271603 ||  || — || August 6, 2004 || Palomar || NEAT || — || align=right | 1.3 km || 
|-id=604 bgcolor=#E9E9E9
| 271604 ||  || — || August 6, 2004 || Palomar || NEAT || — || align=right | 2.4 km || 
|-id=605 bgcolor=#fefefe
| 271605 ||  || — || August 6, 2004 || Palomar || NEAT || — || align=right data-sort-value="0.94" | 940 m || 
|-id=606 bgcolor=#fefefe
| 271606 ||  || — || August 6, 2004 || Campo Imperatore || CINEOS || NYS || align=right data-sort-value="0.74" | 740 m || 
|-id=607 bgcolor=#fefefe
| 271607 ||  || — || August 7, 2004 || Palomar || NEAT || — || align=right | 1.9 km || 
|-id=608 bgcolor=#d6d6d6
| 271608 ||  || — || August 7, 2004 || Palomar || NEAT || — || align=right | 2.6 km || 
|-id=609 bgcolor=#fefefe
| 271609 ||  || — || August 8, 2004 || Anderson Mesa || LONEOS || — || align=right | 1.4 km || 
|-id=610 bgcolor=#E9E9E9
| 271610 ||  || — || August 7, 2004 || Palomar || NEAT || — || align=right | 1.1 km || 
|-id=611 bgcolor=#fefefe
| 271611 ||  || — || August 7, 2004 || Palomar || NEAT || H || align=right data-sort-value="0.76" | 760 m || 
|-id=612 bgcolor=#fefefe
| 271612 ||  || — || August 8, 2004 || Socorro || LINEAR || — || align=right | 1.4 km || 
|-id=613 bgcolor=#fefefe
| 271613 ||  || — || August 9, 2004 || Reedy Creek || J. Broughton || — || align=right | 1.0 km || 
|-id=614 bgcolor=#E9E9E9
| 271614 ||  || — || August 9, 2004 || Socorro || LINEAR || MAR || align=right | 1.6 km || 
|-id=615 bgcolor=#fefefe
| 271615 ||  || — || August 9, 2004 || Socorro || LINEAR || — || align=right data-sort-value="0.90" | 900 m || 
|-id=616 bgcolor=#E9E9E9
| 271616 ||  || — || August 9, 2004 || Socorro || LINEAR || ADE || align=right | 2.8 km || 
|-id=617 bgcolor=#E9E9E9
| 271617 ||  || — || August 7, 2004 || Palomar || NEAT || — || align=right | 1.4 km || 
|-id=618 bgcolor=#E9E9E9
| 271618 ||  || — || August 8, 2004 || Campo Imperatore || CINEOS || — || align=right | 1.2 km || 
|-id=619 bgcolor=#fefefe
| 271619 ||  || — || August 8, 2004 || Socorro || LINEAR || — || align=right | 2.4 km || 
|-id=620 bgcolor=#E9E9E9
| 271620 ||  || — || August 8, 2004 || Socorro || LINEAR || — || align=right | 2.9 km || 
|-id=621 bgcolor=#E9E9E9
| 271621 ||  || — || August 8, 2004 || Socorro || LINEAR || — || align=right | 1.3 km || 
|-id=622 bgcolor=#E9E9E9
| 271622 ||  || — || August 8, 2004 || Socorro || LINEAR || — || align=right | 1.2 km || 
|-id=623 bgcolor=#fefefe
| 271623 ||  || — || August 8, 2004 || Anderson Mesa || LONEOS || — || align=right | 1.1 km || 
|-id=624 bgcolor=#E9E9E9
| 271624 ||  || — || August 8, 2004 || Anderson Mesa || LONEOS || — || align=right | 4.0 km || 
|-id=625 bgcolor=#E9E9E9
| 271625 ||  || — || August 9, 2004 || Socorro || LINEAR || — || align=right | 2.6 km || 
|-id=626 bgcolor=#E9E9E9
| 271626 ||  || — || August 9, 2004 || Socorro || LINEAR || EUN || align=right | 1.7 km || 
|-id=627 bgcolor=#fefefe
| 271627 ||  || — || August 10, 2004 || Socorro || LINEAR || — || align=right | 1.3 km || 
|-id=628 bgcolor=#E9E9E9
| 271628 ||  || — || August 10, 2004 || Anderson Mesa || LONEOS || — || align=right | 2.1 km || 
|-id=629 bgcolor=#fefefe
| 271629 ||  || — || August 5, 2004 || Palomar || NEAT || — || align=right | 1.1 km || 
|-id=630 bgcolor=#fefefe
| 271630 ||  || — || August 6, 2004 || Palomar || NEAT || — || align=right | 1.4 km || 
|-id=631 bgcolor=#E9E9E9
| 271631 ||  || — || August 7, 2004 || Palomar || NEAT || — || align=right | 1.4 km || 
|-id=632 bgcolor=#fefefe
| 271632 ||  || — || August 7, 2004 || Campo Imperatore || CINEOS || — || align=right | 3.1 km || 
|-id=633 bgcolor=#E9E9E9
| 271633 ||  || — || August 8, 2004 || Socorro || LINEAR || — || align=right | 1.1 km || 
|-id=634 bgcolor=#E9E9E9
| 271634 ||  || — || August 9, 2004 || Anderson Mesa || LONEOS || — || align=right | 1.2 km || 
|-id=635 bgcolor=#fefefe
| 271635 ||  || — || August 9, 2004 || Socorro || LINEAR || — || align=right | 1.3 km || 
|-id=636 bgcolor=#d6d6d6
| 271636 ||  || — || August 9, 2004 || Socorro || LINEAR || — || align=right | 3.3 km || 
|-id=637 bgcolor=#E9E9E9
| 271637 ||  || — || August 10, 2004 || Socorro || LINEAR || — || align=right | 1.1 km || 
|-id=638 bgcolor=#E9E9E9
| 271638 ||  || — || August 10, 2004 || Socorro || LINEAR || — || align=right | 1.4 km || 
|-id=639 bgcolor=#E9E9E9
| 271639 ||  || — || August 10, 2004 || Socorro || LINEAR || — || align=right | 2.5 km || 
|-id=640 bgcolor=#fefefe
| 271640 ||  || — || August 8, 2004 || Socorro || LINEAR || — || align=right | 1.4 km || 
|-id=641 bgcolor=#E9E9E9
| 271641 ||  || — || August 15, 2004 || Reedy Creek || J. Broughton || — || align=right | 1.6 km || 
|-id=642 bgcolor=#E9E9E9
| 271642 ||  || — || August 11, 2004 || Socorro || LINEAR || — || align=right | 2.9 km || 
|-id=643 bgcolor=#E9E9E9
| 271643 ||  || — || August 11, 2004 || Socorro || LINEAR || — || align=right | 2.9 km || 
|-id=644 bgcolor=#E9E9E9
| 271644 ||  || — || August 11, 2004 || Socorro || LINEAR || — || align=right | 3.7 km || 
|-id=645 bgcolor=#E9E9E9
| 271645 ||  || — || August 11, 2004 || Socorro || LINEAR || — || align=right | 1.9 km || 
|-id=646 bgcolor=#E9E9E9
| 271646 ||  || — || August 12, 2004 || Socorro || LINEAR || IAN || align=right | 1.2 km || 
|-id=647 bgcolor=#E9E9E9
| 271647 ||  || — || August 13, 2004 || Palomar || NEAT || — || align=right | 3.7 km || 
|-id=648 bgcolor=#fefefe
| 271648 ||  || — || August 11, 2004 || Socorro || LINEAR || NYS || align=right data-sort-value="0.91" | 910 m || 
|-id=649 bgcolor=#E9E9E9
| 271649 ||  || — || August 21, 2004 || Catalina || CSS || — || align=right | 1.7 km || 
|-id=650 bgcolor=#E9E9E9
| 271650 ||  || — || August 16, 2004 || Siding Spring || SSS || — || align=right | 1.7 km || 
|-id=651 bgcolor=#fefefe
| 271651 ||  || — || August 21, 2004 || Siding Spring || SSS || — || align=right | 1.1 km || 
|-id=652 bgcolor=#E9E9E9
| 271652 ||  || — || August 21, 2004 || Catalina || CSS || JUN || align=right | 1.4 km || 
|-id=653 bgcolor=#E9E9E9
| 271653 ||  || — || August 20, 2004 || Catalina || CSS || EUN || align=right | 2.1 km || 
|-id=654 bgcolor=#fefefe
| 271654 ||  || — || August 26, 2004 || Catalina || CSS || H || align=right data-sort-value="0.80" | 800 m || 
|-id=655 bgcolor=#E9E9E9
| 271655 ||  || — || August 20, 2004 || Socorro || LINEAR || BAR || align=right | 1.8 km || 
|-id=656 bgcolor=#E9E9E9
| 271656 ||  || — || September 5, 2004 || Palomar || NEAT || GER || align=right | 1.9 km || 
|-id=657 bgcolor=#E9E9E9
| 271657 ||  || — || September 4, 2004 || Palomar || NEAT || — || align=right | 3.3 km || 
|-id=658 bgcolor=#E9E9E9
| 271658 ||  || — || September 7, 2004 || Kitt Peak || Spacewatch || — || align=right | 1.8 km || 
|-id=659 bgcolor=#E9E9E9
| 271659 ||  || — || September 7, 2004 || Kitt Peak || Spacewatch || KON || align=right | 2.9 km || 
|-id=660 bgcolor=#E9E9E9
| 271660 ||  || — || September 7, 2004 || Kitt Peak || Spacewatch || — || align=right | 1.3 km || 
|-id=661 bgcolor=#E9E9E9
| 271661 ||  || — || September 7, 2004 || Socorro || LINEAR || HEN || align=right | 1.3 km || 
|-id=662 bgcolor=#E9E9E9
| 271662 ||  || — || September 7, 2004 || Kitt Peak || Spacewatch || — || align=right | 2.6 km || 
|-id=663 bgcolor=#E9E9E9
| 271663 ||  || — || September 8, 2004 || Socorro || LINEAR || HNS || align=right | 1.6 km || 
|-id=664 bgcolor=#E9E9E9
| 271664 ||  || — || September 8, 2004 || Socorro || LINEAR || — || align=right | 3.2 km || 
|-id=665 bgcolor=#E9E9E9
| 271665 ||  || — || September 8, 2004 || Socorro || LINEAR || — || align=right | 1.5 km || 
|-id=666 bgcolor=#E9E9E9
| 271666 ||  || — || September 8, 2004 || Socorro || LINEAR || — || align=right | 3.7 km || 
|-id=667 bgcolor=#E9E9E9
| 271667 ||  || — || September 8, 2004 || Socorro || LINEAR || RAF || align=right | 1.1 km || 
|-id=668 bgcolor=#E9E9E9
| 271668 ||  || — || September 8, 2004 || Socorro || LINEAR || — || align=right | 2.9 km || 
|-id=669 bgcolor=#E9E9E9
| 271669 ||  || — || September 8, 2004 || Socorro || LINEAR || — || align=right | 1.0 km || 
|-id=670 bgcolor=#E9E9E9
| 271670 ||  || — || September 8, 2004 || Socorro || LINEAR || — || align=right | 3.6 km || 
|-id=671 bgcolor=#E9E9E9
| 271671 ||  || — || September 8, 2004 || Socorro || LINEAR || — || align=right | 2.0 km || 
|-id=672 bgcolor=#E9E9E9
| 271672 ||  || — || September 8, 2004 || Socorro || LINEAR || — || align=right | 2.5 km || 
|-id=673 bgcolor=#E9E9E9
| 271673 ||  || — || September 8, 2004 || Socorro || LINEAR || — || align=right | 1.7 km || 
|-id=674 bgcolor=#E9E9E9
| 271674 ||  || — || September 8, 2004 || Socorro || LINEAR || — || align=right | 2.2 km || 
|-id=675 bgcolor=#E9E9E9
| 271675 ||  || — || September 8, 2004 || Socorro || LINEAR || — || align=right | 1.9 km || 
|-id=676 bgcolor=#E9E9E9
| 271676 ||  || — || September 8, 2004 || Socorro || LINEAR || — || align=right | 2.3 km || 
|-id=677 bgcolor=#E9E9E9
| 271677 ||  || — || September 8, 2004 || Socorro || LINEAR || — || align=right | 3.1 km || 
|-id=678 bgcolor=#E9E9E9
| 271678 ||  || — || September 8, 2004 || Socorro || LINEAR || — || align=right | 2.4 km || 
|-id=679 bgcolor=#E9E9E9
| 271679 ||  || — || September 8, 2004 || Palomar || NEAT || — || align=right | 2.1 km || 
|-id=680 bgcolor=#E9E9E9
| 271680 ||  || — || September 8, 2004 || Socorro || LINEAR || — || align=right | 1.1 km || 
|-id=681 bgcolor=#E9E9E9
| 271681 ||  || — || September 8, 2004 || Palomar || NEAT || — || align=right | 1.1 km || 
|-id=682 bgcolor=#E9E9E9
| 271682 ||  || — || September 9, 2004 || Socorro || LINEAR || — || align=right | 1.7 km || 
|-id=683 bgcolor=#fefefe
| 271683 ||  || — || September 8, 2004 || Palomar || NEAT || H || align=right data-sort-value="0.99" | 990 m || 
|-id=684 bgcolor=#E9E9E9
| 271684 ||  || — || September 6, 2004 || Siding Spring || SSS || — || align=right data-sort-value="0.97" | 970 m || 
|-id=685 bgcolor=#fefefe
| 271685 ||  || — || September 8, 2004 || Socorro || LINEAR || — || align=right | 1.1 km || 
|-id=686 bgcolor=#E9E9E9
| 271686 ||  || — || September 8, 2004 || Socorro || LINEAR || — || align=right | 1.2 km || 
|-id=687 bgcolor=#E9E9E9
| 271687 ||  || — || September 8, 2004 || Palomar || NEAT || GEF || align=right | 1.6 km || 
|-id=688 bgcolor=#E9E9E9
| 271688 ||  || — || September 8, 2004 || Socorro || LINEAR || — || align=right | 2.1 km || 
|-id=689 bgcolor=#E9E9E9
| 271689 ||  || — || September 8, 2004 || Socorro || LINEAR || AEO || align=right | 1.4 km || 
|-id=690 bgcolor=#E9E9E9
| 271690 ||  || — || September 8, 2004 || Socorro || LINEAR || — || align=right | 1.8 km || 
|-id=691 bgcolor=#E9E9E9
| 271691 ||  || — || September 9, 2004 || Apache Point || Apache Point Obs. || — || align=right | 1.1 km || 
|-id=692 bgcolor=#E9E9E9
| 271692 ||  || — || September 9, 2004 || Socorro || LINEAR || — || align=right | 1.2 km || 
|-id=693 bgcolor=#E9E9E9
| 271693 ||  || — || September 7, 2004 || Socorro || LINEAR || IAN || align=right | 1.3 km || 
|-id=694 bgcolor=#E9E9E9
| 271694 ||  || — || September 7, 2004 || Kitt Peak || Spacewatch || — || align=right | 1.6 km || 
|-id=695 bgcolor=#E9E9E9
| 271695 ||  || — || September 8, 2004 || Socorro || LINEAR || — || align=right | 1.6 km || 
|-id=696 bgcolor=#d6d6d6
| 271696 ||  || — || September 8, 2004 || Palomar || NEAT || LIX || align=right | 4.7 km || 
|-id=697 bgcolor=#fefefe
| 271697 ||  || — || September 9, 2004 || Socorro || LINEAR || MAS || align=right data-sort-value="0.88" | 880 m || 
|-id=698 bgcolor=#d6d6d6
| 271698 ||  || — || September 9, 2004 || Socorro || LINEAR || — || align=right | 4.4 km || 
|-id=699 bgcolor=#E9E9E9
| 271699 ||  || — || September 9, 2004 || Socorro || LINEAR || — || align=right | 1.8 km || 
|-id=700 bgcolor=#fefefe
| 271700 ||  || — || September 9, 2004 || Socorro || LINEAR || — || align=right data-sort-value="0.92" | 920 m || 
|}

271701–271800 

|-bgcolor=#E9E9E9
| 271701 ||  || — || September 9, 2004 || Socorro || LINEAR || ADE || align=right | 2.6 km || 
|-id=702 bgcolor=#E9E9E9
| 271702 ||  || — || September 10, 2004 || Socorro || LINEAR || — || align=right | 1.3 km || 
|-id=703 bgcolor=#E9E9E9
| 271703 ||  || — || September 10, 2004 || Socorro || LINEAR || — || align=right | 2.0 km || 
|-id=704 bgcolor=#E9E9E9
| 271704 ||  || — || September 10, 2004 || Socorro || LINEAR || — || align=right | 1.2 km || 
|-id=705 bgcolor=#E9E9E9
| 271705 ||  || — || September 10, 2004 || Socorro || LINEAR || GEF || align=right | 1.7 km || 
|-id=706 bgcolor=#E9E9E9
| 271706 ||  || — || September 9, 2004 || Kitt Peak || Spacewatch || — || align=right | 2.0 km || 
|-id=707 bgcolor=#E9E9E9
| 271707 ||  || — || September 10, 2004 || Socorro || LINEAR || — || align=right | 3.1 km || 
|-id=708 bgcolor=#E9E9E9
| 271708 ||  || — || September 10, 2004 || Socorro || LINEAR || — || align=right | 3.1 km || 
|-id=709 bgcolor=#E9E9E9
| 271709 ||  || — || September 10, 2004 || Socorro || LINEAR || — || align=right | 2.2 km || 
|-id=710 bgcolor=#E9E9E9
| 271710 ||  || — || September 10, 2004 || Socorro || LINEAR || — || align=right | 1.2 km || 
|-id=711 bgcolor=#E9E9E9
| 271711 ||  || — || September 10, 2004 || Socorro || LINEAR || — || align=right | 3.7 km || 
|-id=712 bgcolor=#E9E9E9
| 271712 ||  || — || September 10, 2004 || Socorro || LINEAR || ADE || align=right | 3.4 km || 
|-id=713 bgcolor=#E9E9E9
| 271713 ||  || — || September 10, 2004 || Socorro || LINEAR || — || align=right | 2.7 km || 
|-id=714 bgcolor=#E9E9E9
| 271714 ||  || — || September 11, 2004 || Kitt Peak || Spacewatch || — || align=right data-sort-value="0.91" | 910 m || 
|-id=715 bgcolor=#E9E9E9
| 271715 ||  || — || September 12, 2004 || Socorro || LINEAR || CLO || align=right | 2.9 km || 
|-id=716 bgcolor=#d6d6d6
| 271716 ||  || — || September 11, 2004 || Socorro || LINEAR || — || align=right | 7.4 km || 
|-id=717 bgcolor=#E9E9E9
| 271717 ||  || — || September 11, 2004 || Socorro || LINEAR || — || align=right | 4.8 km || 
|-id=718 bgcolor=#E9E9E9
| 271718 ||  || — || September 11, 2004 || Socorro || LINEAR || — || align=right | 3.9 km || 
|-id=719 bgcolor=#E9E9E9
| 271719 ||  || — || September 11, 2004 || Socorro || LINEAR || — || align=right | 3.6 km || 
|-id=720 bgcolor=#E9E9E9
| 271720 ||  || — || September 9, 2004 || Socorro || LINEAR || — || align=right | 3.3 km || 
|-id=721 bgcolor=#E9E9E9
| 271721 ||  || — || September 9, 2004 || Kitt Peak || Spacewatch || — || align=right | 1.9 km || 
|-id=722 bgcolor=#E9E9E9
| 271722 ||  || — || September 9, 2004 || Kitt Peak || Spacewatch || — || align=right | 1.2 km || 
|-id=723 bgcolor=#E9E9E9
| 271723 ||  || — || September 10, 2004 || Kitt Peak || Spacewatch || — || align=right | 1.8 km || 
|-id=724 bgcolor=#E9E9E9
| 271724 ||  || — || September 10, 2004 || Kitt Peak || Spacewatch || — || align=right | 1.3 km || 
|-id=725 bgcolor=#d6d6d6
| 271725 ||  || — || September 10, 2004 || Kitt Peak || Spacewatch || — || align=right | 3.5 km || 
|-id=726 bgcolor=#E9E9E9
| 271726 ||  || — || September 10, 2004 || Kitt Peak || Spacewatch || EUN || align=right | 1.6 km || 
|-id=727 bgcolor=#E9E9E9
| 271727 ||  || — || September 10, 2004 || Kitt Peak || Spacewatch || — || align=right | 3.0 km || 
|-id=728 bgcolor=#E9E9E9
| 271728 ||  || — || September 14, 2004 || Socorro || LINEAR || WIT || align=right | 1.5 km || 
|-id=729 bgcolor=#fefefe
| 271729 ||  || — || September 8, 2004 || Socorro || LINEAR || H || align=right data-sort-value="0.95" | 950 m || 
|-id=730 bgcolor=#d6d6d6
| 271730 ||  || — || September 10, 2004 || Kitt Peak || Spacewatch || LAU || align=right | 1.0 km || 
|-id=731 bgcolor=#E9E9E9
| 271731 ||  || — || September 11, 2004 || Kitt Peak || Spacewatch || — || align=right | 2.4 km || 
|-id=732 bgcolor=#E9E9E9
| 271732 ||  || — || September 11, 2004 || Kitt Peak || Spacewatch || — || align=right | 1.8 km || 
|-id=733 bgcolor=#d6d6d6
| 271733 ||  || — || September 15, 2004 || 7300 Observatory || W. K. Y. Yeung || EUP || align=right | 8.0 km || 
|-id=734 bgcolor=#E9E9E9
| 271734 ||  || — || September 10, 2004 || Socorro || LINEAR || — || align=right | 1.6 km || 
|-id=735 bgcolor=#E9E9E9
| 271735 ||  || — || September 10, 2004 || Socorro || LINEAR || — || align=right | 4.0 km || 
|-id=736 bgcolor=#E9E9E9
| 271736 ||  || — || September 11, 2004 || Palomar || NEAT || — || align=right | 3.5 km || 
|-id=737 bgcolor=#E9E9E9
| 271737 ||  || — || September 11, 2004 || Kitt Peak || Spacewatch || — || align=right | 1.3 km || 
|-id=738 bgcolor=#E9E9E9
| 271738 ||  || — || September 11, 2004 || Kitt Peak || Spacewatch || — || align=right | 2.8 km || 
|-id=739 bgcolor=#E9E9E9
| 271739 ||  || — || September 11, 2004 || Kitt Peak || Spacewatch || — || align=right | 2.7 km || 
|-id=740 bgcolor=#E9E9E9
| 271740 ||  || — || September 13, 2004 || Socorro || LINEAR || — || align=right | 2.0 km || 
|-id=741 bgcolor=#E9E9E9
| 271741 ||  || — || September 13, 2004 || Palomar || NEAT || — || align=right | 1.1 km || 
|-id=742 bgcolor=#E9E9E9
| 271742 ||  || — || September 11, 2004 || Palomar || NEAT || — || align=right | 1.4 km || 
|-id=743 bgcolor=#E9E9E9
| 271743 ||  || — || September 11, 2004 || Palomar || NEAT || ADE || align=right | 3.9 km || 
|-id=744 bgcolor=#E9E9E9
| 271744 ||  || — || September 13, 2004 || Socorro || LINEAR || — || align=right | 2.2 km || 
|-id=745 bgcolor=#E9E9E9
| 271745 ||  || — || September 13, 2004 || Socorro || LINEAR || — || align=right | 2.7 km || 
|-id=746 bgcolor=#E9E9E9
| 271746 ||  || — || September 13, 2004 || Socorro || LINEAR || — || align=right | 2.0 km || 
|-id=747 bgcolor=#E9E9E9
| 271747 ||  || — || September 15, 2004 || Kitt Peak || Spacewatch || — || align=right | 1.6 km || 
|-id=748 bgcolor=#E9E9E9
| 271748 ||  || — || September 15, 2004 || Kitt Peak || Spacewatch || DOR || align=right | 3.1 km || 
|-id=749 bgcolor=#E9E9E9
| 271749 ||  || — || September 15, 2004 || Kitt Peak || Spacewatch || — || align=right | 2.1 km || 
|-id=750 bgcolor=#E9E9E9
| 271750 ||  || — || September 15, 2004 || Kitt Peak || Spacewatch || — || align=right | 2.1 km || 
|-id=751 bgcolor=#E9E9E9
| 271751 ||  || — || September 7, 2004 || Socorro || LINEAR || — || align=right | 2.4 km || 
|-id=752 bgcolor=#E9E9E9
| 271752 ||  || — || September 9, 2004 || Socorro || LINEAR || JUN || align=right | 2.0 km || 
|-id=753 bgcolor=#E9E9E9
| 271753 ||  || — || September 13, 2004 || Anderson Mesa || LONEOS || — || align=right | 1.2 km || 
|-id=754 bgcolor=#E9E9E9
| 271754 ||  || — || September 10, 2004 || Socorro || LINEAR || — || align=right | 1.6 km || 
|-id=755 bgcolor=#fefefe
| 271755 ||  || — || September 10, 2004 || Socorro || LINEAR || H || align=right data-sort-value="0.70" | 700 m || 
|-id=756 bgcolor=#E9E9E9
| 271756 ||  || — || September 10, 2004 || Socorro || LINEAR || — || align=right | 1.7 km || 
|-id=757 bgcolor=#E9E9E9
| 271757 ||  || — || September 4, 2004 || Palomar || NEAT || — || align=right | 1.8 km || 
|-id=758 bgcolor=#E9E9E9
| 271758 ||  || — || September 16, 2004 || Kitt Peak || Spacewatch || — || align=right | 2.2 km || 
|-id=759 bgcolor=#E9E9E9
| 271759 ||  || — || September 16, 2004 || Socorro || LINEAR || HOF || align=right | 3.2 km || 
|-id=760 bgcolor=#E9E9E9
| 271760 ||  || — || September 17, 2004 || Kitt Peak || Spacewatch || GEF || align=right | 1.4 km || 
|-id=761 bgcolor=#E9E9E9
| 271761 ||  || — || September 17, 2004 || Kitt Peak || Spacewatch || HEN || align=right | 1.3 km || 
|-id=762 bgcolor=#E9E9E9
| 271762 ||  || — || September 17, 2004 || Socorro || LINEAR || — || align=right | 1.3 km || 
|-id=763 bgcolor=#d6d6d6
| 271763 Hebrewu ||  ||  || September 17, 2004 || Jarnac || T. Glinos, D. H. Levy || — || align=right | 1.6 km || 
|-id=764 bgcolor=#E9E9E9
| 271764 ||  || — || September 17, 2004 || Socorro || LINEAR || — || align=right | 2.6 km || 
|-id=765 bgcolor=#E9E9E9
| 271765 ||  || — || September 17, 2004 || Socorro || LINEAR || — || align=right | 2.0 km || 
|-id=766 bgcolor=#E9E9E9
| 271766 ||  || — || September 17, 2004 || Kitt Peak || Spacewatch || — || align=right | 3.4 km || 
|-id=767 bgcolor=#E9E9E9
| 271767 ||  || — || September 17, 2004 || Socorro || LINEAR || — || align=right | 4.0 km || 
|-id=768 bgcolor=#d6d6d6
| 271768 ||  || — || September 18, 2004 || Socorro || LINEAR || HYG || align=right | 2.8 km || 
|-id=769 bgcolor=#E9E9E9
| 271769 ||  || — || September 18, 2004 || Socorro || LINEAR || — || align=right | 1.9 km || 
|-id=770 bgcolor=#E9E9E9
| 271770 ||  || — || September 22, 2004 || Kitt Peak || Spacewatch || — || align=right | 1.9 km || 
|-id=771 bgcolor=#E9E9E9
| 271771 ||  || — || September 23, 2004 || Kitt Peak || Spacewatch || — || align=right | 2.5 km || 
|-id=772 bgcolor=#E9E9E9
| 271772 || 2004 TA || — || October 2, 2004 || Three Buttes || G. R. Jones || AGN || align=right | 1.4 km || 
|-id=773 bgcolor=#fefefe
| 271773 ||  || — || October 4, 2004 || Palomar || NEAT || H || align=right data-sort-value="0.96" | 960 m || 
|-id=774 bgcolor=#FA8072
| 271774 ||  || — || October 9, 2004 || Kitt Peak || Spacewatch || — || align=right data-sort-value="0.49" | 490 m || 
|-id=775 bgcolor=#E9E9E9
| 271775 ||  || — || October 8, 2004 || Goodricke-Pigott || R. A. Tucker || MRX || align=right | 1.6 km || 
|-id=776 bgcolor=#E9E9E9
| 271776 ||  || — || October 6, 2004 || Socorro || LINEAR || — || align=right | 3.5 km || 
|-id=777 bgcolor=#fefefe
| 271777 ||  || — || October 9, 2004 || Socorro || LINEAR || H || align=right data-sort-value="0.79" | 790 m || 
|-id=778 bgcolor=#fefefe
| 271778 ||  || — || October 15, 2004 || Socorro || LINEAR || H || align=right data-sort-value="0.86" | 860 m || 
|-id=779 bgcolor=#d6d6d6
| 271779 ||  || — || October 4, 2004 || Kitt Peak || Spacewatch || — || align=right | 2.9 km || 
|-id=780 bgcolor=#E9E9E9
| 271780 ||  || — || October 4, 2004 || Kitt Peak || Spacewatch || — || align=right | 1.6 km || 
|-id=781 bgcolor=#E9E9E9
| 271781 ||  || — || October 4, 2004 || Kitt Peak || Spacewatch || — || align=right | 1.2 km || 
|-id=782 bgcolor=#E9E9E9
| 271782 ||  || — || October 4, 2004 || Kitt Peak || Spacewatch || — || align=right | 2.0 km || 
|-id=783 bgcolor=#E9E9E9
| 271783 ||  || — || October 4, 2004 || Kitt Peak || Spacewatch || — || align=right | 1.1 km || 
|-id=784 bgcolor=#E9E9E9
| 271784 ||  || — || October 4, 2004 || Kitt Peak || Spacewatch || — || align=right | 1.9 km || 
|-id=785 bgcolor=#E9E9E9
| 271785 ||  || — || October 4, 2004 || Kitt Peak || Spacewatch || — || align=right | 1.6 km || 
|-id=786 bgcolor=#E9E9E9
| 271786 ||  || — || October 4, 2004 || Kitt Peak || Spacewatch || — || align=right | 1.0 km || 
|-id=787 bgcolor=#E9E9E9
| 271787 ||  || — || October 4, 2004 || Anderson Mesa || LONEOS || JUN || align=right | 1.4 km || 
|-id=788 bgcolor=#E9E9E9
| 271788 ||  || — || October 4, 2004 || Kitt Peak || Spacewatch || — || align=right | 1.2 km || 
|-id=789 bgcolor=#E9E9E9
| 271789 ||  || — || October 4, 2004 || Kitt Peak || Spacewatch || — || align=right | 1.7 km || 
|-id=790 bgcolor=#d6d6d6
| 271790 ||  || — || October 4, 2004 || Kitt Peak || Spacewatch || — || align=right | 2.4 km || 
|-id=791 bgcolor=#E9E9E9
| 271791 ||  || — || October 4, 2004 || Kitt Peak || Spacewatch || — || align=right | 1.7 km || 
|-id=792 bgcolor=#E9E9E9
| 271792 ||  || — || October 4, 2004 || Kitt Peak || Spacewatch || WIT || align=right | 1.3 km || 
|-id=793 bgcolor=#E9E9E9
| 271793 ||  || — || October 4, 2004 || Kitt Peak || Spacewatch || — || align=right | 2.8 km || 
|-id=794 bgcolor=#E9E9E9
| 271794 ||  || — || October 4, 2004 || Kitt Peak || Spacewatch || — || align=right | 3.3 km || 
|-id=795 bgcolor=#E9E9E9
| 271795 ||  || — || October 5, 2004 || Kitt Peak || Spacewatch || — || align=right | 2.2 km || 
|-id=796 bgcolor=#E9E9E9
| 271796 ||  || — || October 5, 2004 || Kitt Peak || Spacewatch || — || align=right | 2.6 km || 
|-id=797 bgcolor=#E9E9E9
| 271797 ||  || — || October 5, 2004 || Anderson Mesa || LONEOS || — || align=right | 2.0 km || 
|-id=798 bgcolor=#E9E9E9
| 271798 ||  || — || October 5, 2004 || Kitt Peak || Spacewatch || — || align=right data-sort-value="0.94" | 940 m || 
|-id=799 bgcolor=#E9E9E9
| 271799 ||  || — || October 5, 2004 || Anderson Mesa || LONEOS || — || align=right | 3.6 km || 
|-id=800 bgcolor=#E9E9E9
| 271800 ||  || — || October 5, 2004 || Anderson Mesa || LONEOS || — || align=right | 2.2 km || 
|}

271801–271900 

|-bgcolor=#E9E9E9
| 271801 ||  || — || October 4, 2004 || Apache Point || Apache Point Obs. || — || align=right | 1.9 km || 
|-id=802 bgcolor=#E9E9E9
| 271802 ||  || — || October 5, 2004 || Kitt Peak || Spacewatch || — || align=right | 1.5 km || 
|-id=803 bgcolor=#E9E9E9
| 271803 ||  || — || October 5, 2004 || Kitt Peak || Spacewatch || AGN || align=right | 1.7 km || 
|-id=804 bgcolor=#d6d6d6
| 271804 ||  || — || October 5, 2004 || Kitt Peak || Spacewatch || — || align=right | 1.7 km || 
|-id=805 bgcolor=#E9E9E9
| 271805 ||  || — || October 5, 2004 || Kitt Peak || Spacewatch || — || align=right | 3.1 km || 
|-id=806 bgcolor=#E9E9E9
| 271806 ||  || — || October 5, 2004 || Kitt Peak || Spacewatch || — || align=right | 2.1 km || 
|-id=807 bgcolor=#d6d6d6
| 271807 ||  || — || October 5, 2004 || Kitt Peak || Spacewatch || — || align=right | 5.9 km || 
|-id=808 bgcolor=#E9E9E9
| 271808 ||  || — || October 5, 2004 || Kitt Peak || Spacewatch || — || align=right | 2.0 km || 
|-id=809 bgcolor=#E9E9E9
| 271809 ||  || — || October 6, 2004 || Kitt Peak || Spacewatch || — || align=right | 2.7 km || 
|-id=810 bgcolor=#E9E9E9
| 271810 ||  || — || October 6, 2004 || Palomar || NEAT || — || align=right | 2.4 km || 
|-id=811 bgcolor=#E9E9E9
| 271811 ||  || — || October 7, 2004 || Socorro || LINEAR || — || align=right | 2.8 km || 
|-id=812 bgcolor=#E9E9E9
| 271812 ||  || — || October 5, 2004 || Anderson Mesa || LONEOS || — || align=right | 2.8 km || 
|-id=813 bgcolor=#E9E9E9
| 271813 ||  || — || October 5, 2004 || Anderson Mesa || LONEOS || — || align=right | 2.8 km || 
|-id=814 bgcolor=#E9E9E9
| 271814 ||  || — || October 6, 2004 || Palomar || NEAT || — || align=right | 3.5 km || 
|-id=815 bgcolor=#E9E9E9
| 271815 ||  || — || October 7, 2004 || Anderson Mesa || LONEOS || — || align=right | 1.3 km || 
|-id=816 bgcolor=#E9E9E9
| 271816 ||  || — || October 7, 2004 || Anderson Mesa || LONEOS || MRX || align=right | 1.3 km || 
|-id=817 bgcolor=#d6d6d6
| 271817 ||  || — || October 7, 2004 || Socorro || LINEAR || CHA || align=right | 2.8 km || 
|-id=818 bgcolor=#E9E9E9
| 271818 ||  || — || October 7, 2004 || Socorro || LINEAR || — || align=right | 1.5 km || 
|-id=819 bgcolor=#E9E9E9
| 271819 ||  || — || October 7, 2004 || Socorro || LINEAR || — || align=right | 2.9 km || 
|-id=820 bgcolor=#E9E9E9
| 271820 ||  || — || October 8, 2004 || Anderson Mesa || LONEOS || MAR || align=right | 1.5 km || 
|-id=821 bgcolor=#E9E9E9
| 271821 ||  || — || October 9, 2004 || Anderson Mesa || LONEOS || HNS || align=right | 2.9 km || 
|-id=822 bgcolor=#E9E9E9
| 271822 ||  || — || October 4, 2004 || Kitt Peak || Spacewatch || — || align=right | 2.8 km || 
|-id=823 bgcolor=#E9E9E9
| 271823 ||  || — || October 5, 2004 || Kitt Peak || Spacewatch || EUN || align=right | 1.4 km || 
|-id=824 bgcolor=#E9E9E9
| 271824 ||  || — || October 5, 2004 || Kitt Peak || Spacewatch || — || align=right | 3.4 km || 
|-id=825 bgcolor=#E9E9E9
| 271825 ||  || — || October 6, 2004 || Kitt Peak || Spacewatch || AGN || align=right | 1.2 km || 
|-id=826 bgcolor=#E9E9E9
| 271826 ||  || — || October 6, 2004 || Kitt Peak || Spacewatch || — || align=right | 2.0 km || 
|-id=827 bgcolor=#E9E9E9
| 271827 ||  || — || October 6, 2004 || Kitt Peak || Spacewatch || PAD || align=right | 2.8 km || 
|-id=828 bgcolor=#E9E9E9
| 271828 ||  || — || October 7, 2004 || Kitt Peak || Spacewatch || — || align=right | 1.3 km || 
|-id=829 bgcolor=#E9E9E9
| 271829 ||  || — || October 7, 2004 || Kitt Peak || Spacewatch || HNA || align=right | 2.2 km || 
|-id=830 bgcolor=#E9E9E9
| 271830 ||  || — || October 7, 2004 || Socorro || LINEAR || — || align=right | 3.6 km || 
|-id=831 bgcolor=#E9E9E9
| 271831 ||  || — || October 7, 2004 || Socorro || LINEAR || — || align=right | 2.7 km || 
|-id=832 bgcolor=#E9E9E9
| 271832 ||  || — || October 8, 2004 || Socorro || LINEAR || MRX || align=right | 1.5 km || 
|-id=833 bgcolor=#fefefe
| 271833 ||  || — || October 8, 2004 || Socorro || LINEAR || H || align=right data-sort-value="0.71" | 710 m || 
|-id=834 bgcolor=#E9E9E9
| 271834 ||  || — || October 7, 2004 || Kitt Peak || Spacewatch || — || align=right | 1.8 km || 
|-id=835 bgcolor=#E9E9E9
| 271835 ||  || — || October 7, 2004 || Kitt Peak || Spacewatch || — || align=right | 1.5 km || 
|-id=836 bgcolor=#E9E9E9
| 271836 ||  || — || October 7, 2004 || Kitt Peak || Spacewatch || WIT || align=right | 1.3 km || 
|-id=837 bgcolor=#E9E9E9
| 271837 ||  || — || October 7, 2004 || Kitt Peak || Spacewatch || — || align=right | 2.8 km || 
|-id=838 bgcolor=#E9E9E9
| 271838 ||  || — || October 7, 2004 || Kitt Peak || Spacewatch || — || align=right | 3.2 km || 
|-id=839 bgcolor=#E9E9E9
| 271839 ||  || — || October 7, 2004 || Kitt Peak || Spacewatch || — || align=right | 2.6 km || 
|-id=840 bgcolor=#E9E9E9
| 271840 ||  || — || October 7, 2004 || Kitt Peak || Spacewatch || RAF || align=right | 1.6 km || 
|-id=841 bgcolor=#E9E9E9
| 271841 ||  || — || October 7, 2004 || Kitt Peak || Spacewatch || INO || align=right | 1.7 km || 
|-id=842 bgcolor=#E9E9E9
| 271842 ||  || — || October 10, 2004 || Kitt Peak || Spacewatch || — || align=right | 1.5 km || 
|-id=843 bgcolor=#E9E9E9
| 271843 ||  || — || October 5, 2004 || Kitt Peak || Spacewatch || KON || align=right | 3.5 km || 
|-id=844 bgcolor=#d6d6d6
| 271844 ||  || — || October 7, 2004 || Palomar || NEAT || BRA || align=right | 1.8 km || 
|-id=845 bgcolor=#E9E9E9
| 271845 ||  || — || October 8, 2004 || Kitt Peak || Spacewatch || — || align=right | 1.7 km || 
|-id=846 bgcolor=#d6d6d6
| 271846 ||  || — || October 8, 2004 || Kitt Peak || Spacewatch || — || align=right | 2.6 km || 
|-id=847 bgcolor=#E9E9E9
| 271847 ||  || — || October 8, 2004 || Kitt Peak || Spacewatch || — || align=right data-sort-value="0.96" | 960 m || 
|-id=848 bgcolor=#E9E9E9
| 271848 ||  || — || October 10, 2004 || Socorro || LINEAR || — || align=right | 2.1 km || 
|-id=849 bgcolor=#d6d6d6
| 271849 ||  || — || October 6, 2004 || Socorro || LINEAR || — || align=right | 4.7 km || 
|-id=850 bgcolor=#E9E9E9
| 271850 ||  || — || October 6, 2004 || Socorro || LINEAR || — || align=right | 3.9 km || 
|-id=851 bgcolor=#E9E9E9
| 271851 ||  || — || October 7, 2004 || Socorro || LINEAR || — || align=right | 1.5 km || 
|-id=852 bgcolor=#E9E9E9
| 271852 ||  || — || October 7, 2004 || Kitt Peak || Spacewatch || — || align=right | 1.9 km || 
|-id=853 bgcolor=#E9E9E9
| 271853 ||  || — || October 9, 2004 || Kitt Peak || Spacewatch || GAL || align=right | 1.7 km || 
|-id=854 bgcolor=#E9E9E9
| 271854 ||  || — || October 9, 2004 || Kitt Peak || Spacewatch || — || align=right | 2.3 km || 
|-id=855 bgcolor=#E9E9E9
| 271855 ||  || — || October 9, 2004 || Kitt Peak || Spacewatch || AGN || align=right | 1.6 km || 
|-id=856 bgcolor=#E9E9E9
| 271856 ||  || — || October 9, 2004 || Kitt Peak || Spacewatch || GEF || align=right | 1.3 km || 
|-id=857 bgcolor=#E9E9E9
| 271857 ||  || — || October 9, 2004 || Kitt Peak || Spacewatch || — || align=right | 2.8 km || 
|-id=858 bgcolor=#E9E9E9
| 271858 ||  || — || October 9, 2004 || Kitt Peak || Spacewatch || JNS || align=right | 3.6 km || 
|-id=859 bgcolor=#E9E9E9
| 271859 ||  || — || October 9, 2004 || Kitt Peak || Spacewatch || — || align=right | 2.5 km || 
|-id=860 bgcolor=#E9E9E9
| 271860 ||  || — || October 9, 2004 || Kitt Peak || Spacewatch || — || align=right data-sort-value="0.91" | 910 m || 
|-id=861 bgcolor=#E9E9E9
| 271861 ||  || — || October 10, 2004 || Kitt Peak || Spacewatch || HOF || align=right | 3.0 km || 
|-id=862 bgcolor=#E9E9E9
| 271862 ||  || — || October 8, 2004 || Kitt Peak || Spacewatch || — || align=right | 2.0 km || 
|-id=863 bgcolor=#E9E9E9
| 271863 ||  || — || October 10, 2004 || Kitt Peak || Spacewatch || — || align=right | 1.4 km || 
|-id=864 bgcolor=#E9E9E9
| 271864 ||  || — || October 8, 2004 || Kitt Peak || Spacewatch || AGN || align=right | 1.2 km || 
|-id=865 bgcolor=#E9E9E9
| 271865 ||  || — || October 10, 2004 || Kitt Peak || Spacewatch || — || align=right | 1.4 km || 
|-id=866 bgcolor=#d6d6d6
| 271866 ||  || — || October 10, 2004 || Socorro || LINEAR || — || align=right | 4.0 km || 
|-id=867 bgcolor=#E9E9E9
| 271867 ||  || — || October 11, 2004 || Kitt Peak || Spacewatch || — || align=right | 1.4 km || 
|-id=868 bgcolor=#d6d6d6
| 271868 ||  || — || October 14, 2004 || Socorro || LINEAR || — || align=right | 3.5 km || 
|-id=869 bgcolor=#E9E9E9
| 271869 ||  || — || October 9, 2004 || Kitt Peak || Spacewatch || — || align=right | 3.3 km || 
|-id=870 bgcolor=#E9E9E9
| 271870 ||  || — || October 9, 2004 || Kitt Peak || Spacewatch || — || align=right | 1.8 km || 
|-id=871 bgcolor=#E9E9E9
| 271871 ||  || — || October 9, 2004 || Kitt Peak || Spacewatch || HEN || align=right | 1.3 km || 
|-id=872 bgcolor=#E9E9E9
| 271872 ||  || — || October 10, 2004 || Kitt Peak || Spacewatch || — || align=right | 3.0 km || 
|-id=873 bgcolor=#E9E9E9
| 271873 ||  || — || October 11, 2004 || Kitt Peak || Spacewatch || MAR || align=right | 1.3 km || 
|-id=874 bgcolor=#E9E9E9
| 271874 ||  || — || October 12, 2004 || Kitt Peak || Spacewatch || — || align=right | 2.8 km || 
|-id=875 bgcolor=#E9E9E9
| 271875 ||  || — || October 14, 2004 || Socorro || LINEAR || — || align=right | 3.3 km || 
|-id=876 bgcolor=#E9E9E9
| 271876 ||  || — || October 10, 2004 || Kitt Peak || Spacewatch || AGN || align=right | 1.5 km || 
|-id=877 bgcolor=#d6d6d6
| 271877 ||  || — || October 11, 2004 || Kitt Peak || M. W. Buie || 615 || align=right | 1.7 km || 
|-id=878 bgcolor=#E9E9E9
| 271878 ||  || — || October 9, 2004 || Anderson Mesa || LONEOS || — || align=right | 3.1 km || 
|-id=879 bgcolor=#E9E9E9
| 271879 ||  || — || October 21, 2004 || Socorro || LINEAR || — || align=right | 2.6 km || 
|-id=880 bgcolor=#E9E9E9
| 271880 ||  || — || October 21, 2004 || Socorro || LINEAR || GEF || align=right | 1.8 km || 
|-id=881 bgcolor=#fefefe
| 271881 ||  || — || October 25, 2004 || Socorro || LINEAR || H || align=right | 1.2 km || 
|-id=882 bgcolor=#E9E9E9
| 271882 ||  || — || October 19, 2004 || Socorro || LINEAR || — || align=right | 2.4 km || 
|-id=883 bgcolor=#E9E9E9
| 271883 ||  || — || November 2, 2004 || Anderson Mesa || LONEOS || — || align=right | 4.1 km || 
|-id=884 bgcolor=#E9E9E9
| 271884 ||  || — || November 3, 2004 || Kitt Peak || Spacewatch || — || align=right | 2.3 km || 
|-id=885 bgcolor=#E9E9E9
| 271885 ||  || — || November 3, 2004 || Kitt Peak || Spacewatch || AGN || align=right | 1.7 km || 
|-id=886 bgcolor=#E9E9E9
| 271886 ||  || — || November 3, 2004 || Kitt Peak || Spacewatch || — || align=right | 3.2 km || 
|-id=887 bgcolor=#E9E9E9
| 271887 ||  || — || November 3, 2004 || Palomar || NEAT || — || align=right | 3.9 km || 
|-id=888 bgcolor=#E9E9E9
| 271888 ||  || — || November 4, 2004 || Anderson Mesa || LONEOS || — || align=right | 3.2 km || 
|-id=889 bgcolor=#E9E9E9
| 271889 ||  || — || November 2, 2004 || Anderson Mesa || LONEOS || — || align=right | 3.8 km || 
|-id=890 bgcolor=#E9E9E9
| 271890 ||  || — || November 4, 2004 || Catalina || CSS || GEF || align=right | 1.8 km || 
|-id=891 bgcolor=#d6d6d6
| 271891 ||  || — || November 5, 2004 || Needville || J. Dellinger, P. Garossino || — || align=right | 2.8 km || 
|-id=892 bgcolor=#E9E9E9
| 271892 ||  || — || November 3, 2004 || Kitt Peak || Spacewatch || WIT || align=right | 1.1 km || 
|-id=893 bgcolor=#d6d6d6
| 271893 ||  || — || November 3, 2004 || Kitt Peak || Spacewatch || KOR || align=right | 1.5 km || 
|-id=894 bgcolor=#E9E9E9
| 271894 ||  || — || November 4, 2004 || Kitt Peak || Spacewatch || — || align=right | 2.6 km || 
|-id=895 bgcolor=#E9E9E9
| 271895 ||  || — || November 4, 2004 || Kitt Peak || Spacewatch || — || align=right | 2.1 km || 
|-id=896 bgcolor=#E9E9E9
| 271896 ||  || — || November 4, 2004 || Kitt Peak || Spacewatch || HOF || align=right | 3.0 km || 
|-id=897 bgcolor=#E9E9E9
| 271897 ||  || — || November 4, 2004 || Kitt Peak || Spacewatch || — || align=right | 2.4 km || 
|-id=898 bgcolor=#E9E9E9
| 271898 ||  || — || November 5, 2004 || Palomar || NEAT || — || align=right | 3.2 km || 
|-id=899 bgcolor=#E9E9E9
| 271899 ||  || — || November 4, 2004 || Catalina || CSS || — || align=right | 2.8 km || 
|-id=900 bgcolor=#E9E9E9
| 271900 ||  || — || November 10, 2004 || Kitt Peak || M. W. Buie || NEM || align=right | 2.7 km || 
|}

271901–272000 

|-bgcolor=#d6d6d6
| 271901 ||  || — || November 7, 2004 || Palomar || NEAT || — || align=right | 1.8 km || 
|-id=902 bgcolor=#E9E9E9
| 271902 ||  || — || November 3, 2004 || Kitt Peak || Spacewatch || — || align=right | 1.8 km || 
|-id=903 bgcolor=#E9E9E9
| 271903 ||  || — || November 18, 2004 || Socorro || LINEAR || MAR || align=right | 1.5 km || 
|-id=904 bgcolor=#E9E9E9
| 271904 ||  || — || November 19, 2004 || Kitt Peak || Spacewatch || AGN || align=right | 1.3 km || 
|-id=905 bgcolor=#E9E9E9
| 271905 ||  || — || December 2, 2004 || Socorro || LINEAR || — || align=right | 2.6 km || 
|-id=906 bgcolor=#E9E9E9
| 271906 ||  || — || December 9, 2004 || Catalina || CSS || GEF || align=right | 1.7 km || 
|-id=907 bgcolor=#d6d6d6
| 271907 ||  || — || December 2, 2004 || Socorro || LINEAR || — || align=right | 3.5 km || 
|-id=908 bgcolor=#d6d6d6
| 271908 ||  || — || December 2, 2004 || Kitt Peak || Spacewatch || ELF || align=right | 4.5 km || 
|-id=909 bgcolor=#E9E9E9
| 271909 ||  || — || December 10, 2004 || Kitt Peak || Spacewatch || — || align=right | 2.0 km || 
|-id=910 bgcolor=#d6d6d6
| 271910 ||  || — || December 8, 2004 || Socorro || LINEAR || EOS || align=right | 2.7 km || 
|-id=911 bgcolor=#d6d6d6
| 271911 ||  || — || December 10, 2004 || Socorro || LINEAR || — || align=right | 3.0 km || 
|-id=912 bgcolor=#d6d6d6
| 271912 ||  || — || December 10, 2004 || Kitt Peak || Spacewatch || — || align=right | 4.1 km || 
|-id=913 bgcolor=#fefefe
| 271913 ||  || — || December 10, 2004 || Socorro || LINEAR || H || align=right data-sort-value="0.81" | 810 m || 
|-id=914 bgcolor=#d6d6d6
| 271914 ||  || — || December 11, 2004 || Kitt Peak || Spacewatch || — || align=right | 5.6 km || 
|-id=915 bgcolor=#E9E9E9
| 271915 ||  || — || December 7, 2004 || Socorro || LINEAR || JUN || align=right | 1.6 km || 
|-id=916 bgcolor=#d6d6d6
| 271916 ||  || — || December 7, 2004 || Socorro || LINEAR || — || align=right | 4.3 km || 
|-id=917 bgcolor=#d6d6d6
| 271917 ||  || — || December 11, 2004 || Kitt Peak || Spacewatch || THM || align=right | 2.6 km || 
|-id=918 bgcolor=#d6d6d6
| 271918 ||  || — || December 11, 2004 || Campo Imperatore || CINEOS || — || align=right | 3.7 km || 
|-id=919 bgcolor=#E9E9E9
| 271919 ||  || — || December 9, 2004 || Kitt Peak || Spacewatch || — || align=right | 2.1 km || 
|-id=920 bgcolor=#d6d6d6
| 271920 ||  || — || December 10, 2004 || Kitt Peak || Spacewatch || — || align=right | 4.5 km || 
|-id=921 bgcolor=#E9E9E9
| 271921 ||  || — || December 2, 2004 || Socorro || LINEAR || — || align=right | 3.3 km || 
|-id=922 bgcolor=#E9E9E9
| 271922 ||  || — || December 10, 2004 || Campo Imperatore || CINEOS || — || align=right | 2.2 km || 
|-id=923 bgcolor=#d6d6d6
| 271923 ||  || — || December 9, 2004 || Kitt Peak || Spacewatch || — || align=right | 2.9 km || 
|-id=924 bgcolor=#d6d6d6
| 271924 ||  || — || December 9, 2004 || Socorro || LINEAR || — || align=right | 5.7 km || 
|-id=925 bgcolor=#d6d6d6
| 271925 ||  || — || December 14, 2004 || Socorro || LINEAR || — || align=right | 4.4 km || 
|-id=926 bgcolor=#d6d6d6
| 271926 ||  || — || December 10, 2004 || Socorro || LINEAR || — || align=right | 4.0 km || 
|-id=927 bgcolor=#d6d6d6
| 271927 ||  || — || December 12, 2004 || Kitt Peak || Spacewatch || — || align=right | 3.5 km || 
|-id=928 bgcolor=#d6d6d6
| 271928 ||  || — || December 14, 2004 || Socorro || LINEAR || EMA || align=right | 4.8 km || 
|-id=929 bgcolor=#E9E9E9
| 271929 ||  || — || December 14, 2004 || Catalina || CSS || — || align=right | 3.9 km || 
|-id=930 bgcolor=#d6d6d6
| 271930 ||  || — || December 12, 2004 || Kitt Peak || Spacewatch || — || align=right | 2.9 km || 
|-id=931 bgcolor=#d6d6d6
| 271931 ||  || — || December 12, 2004 || Kitt Peak || Spacewatch || — || align=right | 4.7 km || 
|-id=932 bgcolor=#d6d6d6
| 271932 ||  || — || December 11, 2004 || Catalina || CSS || — || align=right | 2.1 km || 
|-id=933 bgcolor=#E9E9E9
| 271933 ||  || — || December 14, 2004 || Catalina || CSS || GEF || align=right | 2.0 km || 
|-id=934 bgcolor=#d6d6d6
| 271934 ||  || — || December 15, 2004 || Socorro || LINEAR || — || align=right | 5.1 km || 
|-id=935 bgcolor=#E9E9E9
| 271935 ||  || — || December 14, 2004 || Catalina || CSS || — || align=right | 3.1 km || 
|-id=936 bgcolor=#E9E9E9
| 271936 ||  || — || December 14, 2004 || Catalina || CSS || — || align=right | 3.0 km || 
|-id=937 bgcolor=#d6d6d6
| 271937 ||  || — || December 3, 2004 || Kitt Peak || Spacewatch || KOR || align=right | 2.1 km || 
|-id=938 bgcolor=#d6d6d6
| 271938 ||  || — || December 9, 2004 || Kitt Peak || Spacewatch || CHA || align=right | 2.8 km || 
|-id=939 bgcolor=#d6d6d6
| 271939 ||  || — || December 11, 2004 || Kitt Peak || Spacewatch || KOR || align=right | 1.4 km || 
|-id=940 bgcolor=#E9E9E9
| 271940 ||  || — || December 2, 2004 || Socorro || LINEAR || DOR || align=right | 3.2 km || 
|-id=941 bgcolor=#d6d6d6
| 271941 ||  || — || December 16, 2004 || Catalina || CSS || — || align=right | 3.9 km || 
|-id=942 bgcolor=#d6d6d6
| 271942 ||  || — || December 18, 2004 || Mount Lemmon || Mount Lemmon Survey || — || align=right | 3.7 km || 
|-id=943 bgcolor=#E9E9E9
| 271943 ||  || — || December 16, 2004 || Kitt Peak || Spacewatch || HOF || align=right | 3.9 km || 
|-id=944 bgcolor=#d6d6d6
| 271944 ||  || — || December 19, 2004 || Socorro || LINEAR || Tj (2.98) || align=right | 4.7 km || 
|-id=945 bgcolor=#d6d6d6
| 271945 ||  || — || January 6, 2005 || Catalina || CSS || — || align=right | 4.1 km || 
|-id=946 bgcolor=#d6d6d6
| 271946 ||  || — || January 6, 2005 || Catalina || CSS || EUP || align=right | 6.3 km || 
|-id=947 bgcolor=#d6d6d6
| 271947 ||  || — || January 6, 2005 || Catalina || CSS || EOS || align=right | 3.1 km || 
|-id=948 bgcolor=#d6d6d6
| 271948 ||  || — || January 6, 2005 || Socorro || LINEAR || TIR || align=right | 4.1 km || 
|-id=949 bgcolor=#d6d6d6
| 271949 ||  || — || January 6, 2005 || Socorro || LINEAR || — || align=right | 4.7 km || 
|-id=950 bgcolor=#d6d6d6
| 271950 ||  || — || January 7, 2005 || Socorro || LINEAR || — || align=right | 5.4 km || 
|-id=951 bgcolor=#d6d6d6
| 271951 ||  || — || January 7, 2005 || Socorro || LINEAR || — || align=right | 4.3 km || 
|-id=952 bgcolor=#d6d6d6
| 271952 ||  || — || January 8, 2005 || Campo Imperatore || CINEOS || — || align=right | 5.1 km || 
|-id=953 bgcolor=#d6d6d6
| 271953 ||  || — || January 11, 2005 || Socorro || LINEAR || — || align=right | 4.9 km || 
|-id=954 bgcolor=#d6d6d6
| 271954 ||  || — || January 13, 2005 || Socorro || LINEAR || — || align=right | 2.7 km || 
|-id=955 bgcolor=#d6d6d6
| 271955 ||  || — || January 13, 2005 || Kitt Peak || Spacewatch || — || align=right | 3.3 km || 
|-id=956 bgcolor=#d6d6d6
| 271956 ||  || — || January 13, 2005 || Kitt Peak || Spacewatch || — || align=right | 3.7 km || 
|-id=957 bgcolor=#d6d6d6
| 271957 ||  || — || January 13, 2005 || Catalina || CSS || — || align=right | 2.2 km || 
|-id=958 bgcolor=#d6d6d6
| 271958 ||  || — || January 13, 2005 || Jarnac || Jarnac Obs. || — || align=right | 2.9 km || 
|-id=959 bgcolor=#d6d6d6
| 271959 ||  || — || January 13, 2005 || Kitt Peak || Spacewatch || — || align=right | 2.7 km || 
|-id=960 bgcolor=#d6d6d6
| 271960 ||  || — || January 13, 2005 || Socorro || LINEAR || — || align=right | 4.2 km || 
|-id=961 bgcolor=#d6d6d6
| 271961 ||  || — || January 15, 2005 || Catalina || CSS || THB || align=right | 4.2 km || 
|-id=962 bgcolor=#d6d6d6
| 271962 ||  || — || January 15, 2005 || Catalina || CSS || — || align=right | 2.1 km || 
|-id=963 bgcolor=#d6d6d6
| 271963 ||  || — || January 15, 2005 || Socorro || LINEAR || — || align=right | 4.3 km || 
|-id=964 bgcolor=#d6d6d6
| 271964 ||  || — || January 15, 2005 || Kitt Peak || Spacewatch || THM || align=right | 3.4 km || 
|-id=965 bgcolor=#d6d6d6
| 271965 ||  || — || January 15, 2005 || Kitt Peak || Spacewatch || — || align=right | 3.2 km || 
|-id=966 bgcolor=#d6d6d6
| 271966 ||  || — || January 15, 2005 || Kitt Peak || Spacewatch || — || align=right | 3.2 km || 
|-id=967 bgcolor=#d6d6d6
| 271967 ||  || — || January 15, 2005 || Kitt Peak || Spacewatch || — || align=right | 3.7 km || 
|-id=968 bgcolor=#d6d6d6
| 271968 ||  || — || January 15, 2005 || Kitt Peak || Spacewatch || EOS || align=right | 5.3 km || 
|-id=969 bgcolor=#d6d6d6
| 271969 ||  || — || January 15, 2005 || Kitt Peak || Spacewatch || — || align=right | 4.9 km || 
|-id=970 bgcolor=#d6d6d6
| 271970 ||  || — || January 15, 2005 || Kitt Peak || Spacewatch || EOS || align=right | 2.5 km || 
|-id=971 bgcolor=#d6d6d6
| 271971 ||  || — || January 15, 2005 || Kitt Peak || Spacewatch || — || align=right | 5.3 km || 
|-id=972 bgcolor=#d6d6d6
| 271972 ||  || — || January 8, 2005 || Campo Imperatore || CINEOS || — || align=right | 4.0 km || 
|-id=973 bgcolor=#d6d6d6
| 271973 ||  || — || January 16, 2005 || Socorro || LINEAR || EUP || align=right | 5.1 km || 
|-id=974 bgcolor=#d6d6d6
| 271974 ||  || — || January 16, 2005 || Socorro || LINEAR || — || align=right | 2.4 km || 
|-id=975 bgcolor=#d6d6d6
| 271975 ||  || — || January 16, 2005 || Socorro || LINEAR || EUP || align=right | 3.4 km || 
|-id=976 bgcolor=#d6d6d6
| 271976 ||  || — || January 17, 2005 || Socorro || LINEAR || — || align=right | 3.0 km || 
|-id=977 bgcolor=#d6d6d6
| 271977 ||  || — || January 31, 2005 || Palomar || NEAT || — || align=right | 4.2 km || 
|-id=978 bgcolor=#d6d6d6
| 271978 ||  || — || January 16, 2005 || Mauna Kea || C. Veillet || — || align=right | 2.5 km || 
|-id=979 bgcolor=#d6d6d6
| 271979 ||  || — || January 16, 2005 || Mauna Kea || C. Veillet || — || align=right | 2.4 km || 
|-id=980 bgcolor=#d6d6d6
| 271980 ||  || — || January 16, 2005 || Mauna Kea || C. Veillet || EOS || align=right | 2.4 km || 
|-id=981 bgcolor=#d6d6d6
| 271981 ||  || — || February 1, 2005 || Kitt Peak || Spacewatch || HYG || align=right | 3.9 km || 
|-id=982 bgcolor=#d6d6d6
| 271982 ||  || — || February 1, 2005 || Kitt Peak || Spacewatch || — || align=right | 2.7 km || 
|-id=983 bgcolor=#d6d6d6
| 271983 ||  || — || February 2, 2005 || Palomar || NEAT || TIR || align=right | 4.8 km || 
|-id=984 bgcolor=#d6d6d6
| 271984 ||  || — || February 2, 2005 || Kitt Peak || Spacewatch || — || align=right | 4.9 km || 
|-id=985 bgcolor=#d6d6d6
| 271985 ||  || — || February 2, 2005 || Kitt Peak || Spacewatch || THM || align=right | 2.5 km || 
|-id=986 bgcolor=#d6d6d6
| 271986 ||  || — || February 2, 2005 || Socorro || LINEAR || — || align=right | 3.1 km || 
|-id=987 bgcolor=#d6d6d6
| 271987 ||  || — || February 2, 2005 || Socorro || LINEAR || — || align=right | 4.4 km || 
|-id=988 bgcolor=#d6d6d6
| 271988 ||  || — || February 2, 2005 || Socorro || LINEAR || EOS || align=right | 2.5 km || 
|-id=989 bgcolor=#d6d6d6
| 271989 ||  || — || February 3, 2005 || Socorro || LINEAR || — || align=right | 5.4 km || 
|-id=990 bgcolor=#d6d6d6
| 271990 ||  || — || February 2, 2005 || Catalina || CSS || — || align=right | 4.1 km || 
|-id=991 bgcolor=#d6d6d6
| 271991 ||  || — || February 1, 2005 || Catalina || CSS || — || align=right | 4.0 km || 
|-id=992 bgcolor=#d6d6d6
| 271992 ||  || — || February 2, 2005 || Catalina || CSS || — || align=right | 4.6 km || 
|-id=993 bgcolor=#d6d6d6
| 271993 ||  || — || February 1, 2005 || Kitt Peak || Spacewatch || HYG || align=right | 3.6 km || 
|-id=994 bgcolor=#d6d6d6
| 271994 ||  || — || February 1, 2005 || Kitt Peak || Spacewatch || — || align=right | 5.5 km || 
|-id=995 bgcolor=#d6d6d6
| 271995 ||  || — || February 2, 2005 || Kitt Peak || Spacewatch || — || align=right | 3.9 km || 
|-id=996 bgcolor=#d6d6d6
| 271996 ||  || — || February 2, 2005 || Kitt Peak || Spacewatch || EOS || align=right | 2.7 km || 
|-id=997 bgcolor=#d6d6d6
| 271997 ||  || — || February 4, 2005 || Socorro || LINEAR || Tj (2.97) || align=right | 6.2 km || 
|-id=998 bgcolor=#d6d6d6
| 271998 ||  || — || February 9, 2005 || La Silla || C. Vuissoz, R. Behrend || EOS || align=right | 2.3 km || 
|-id=999 bgcolor=#d6d6d6
| 271999 ||  || — || February 2, 2005 || Socorro || LINEAR || — || align=right | 3.1 km || 
|-id=000 bgcolor=#d6d6d6
| 272000 ||  || — || February 2, 2005 || Kitt Peak || Spacewatch || — || align=right | 3.2 km || 
|}

References

External links 
 Discovery Circumstances: Numbered Minor Planets (270001)–(275000) (IAU Minor Planet Center)

0271